= Outline of artificial satellites =

Technology development overview

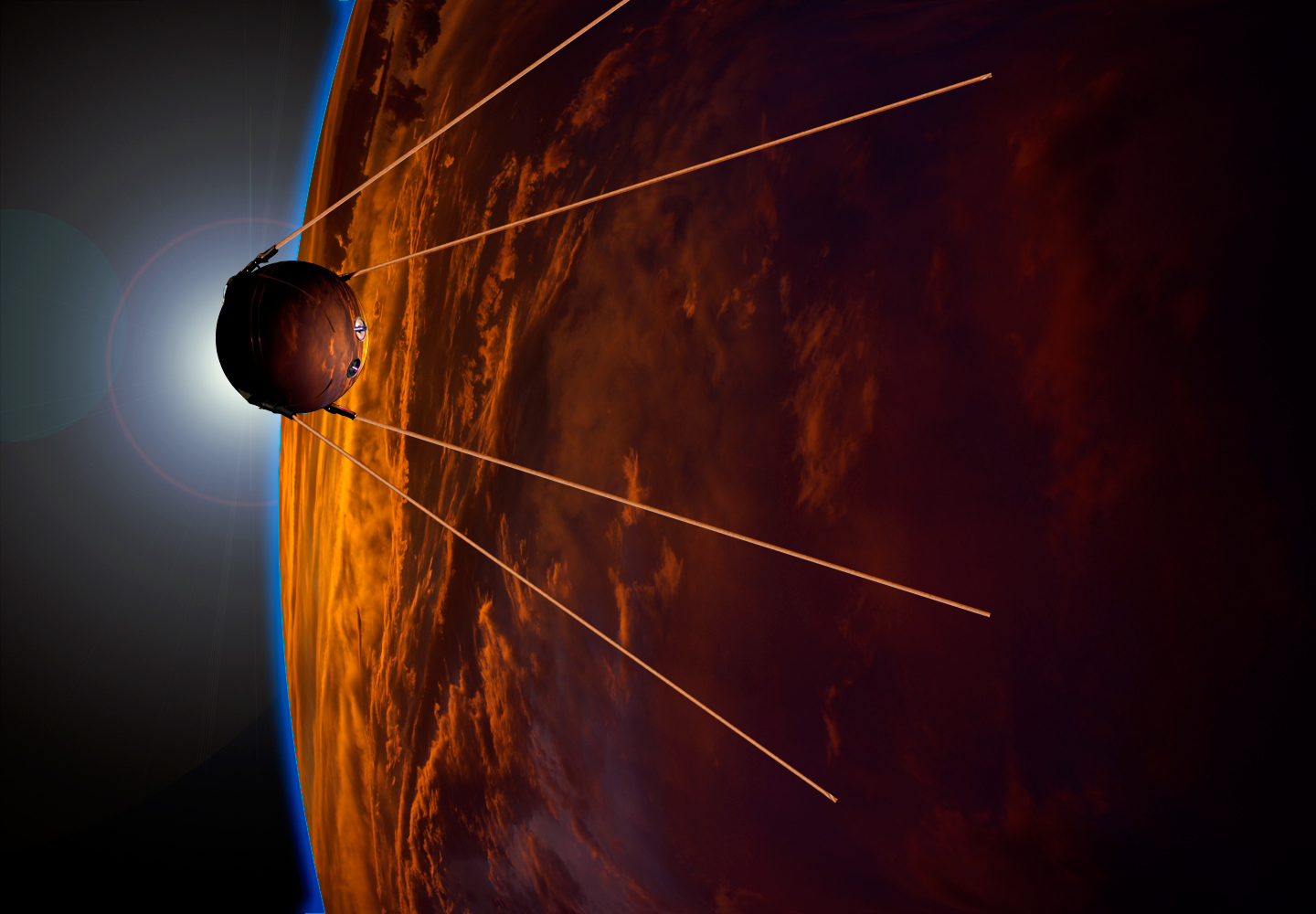
Artist's impression of Sputnik 1 in space

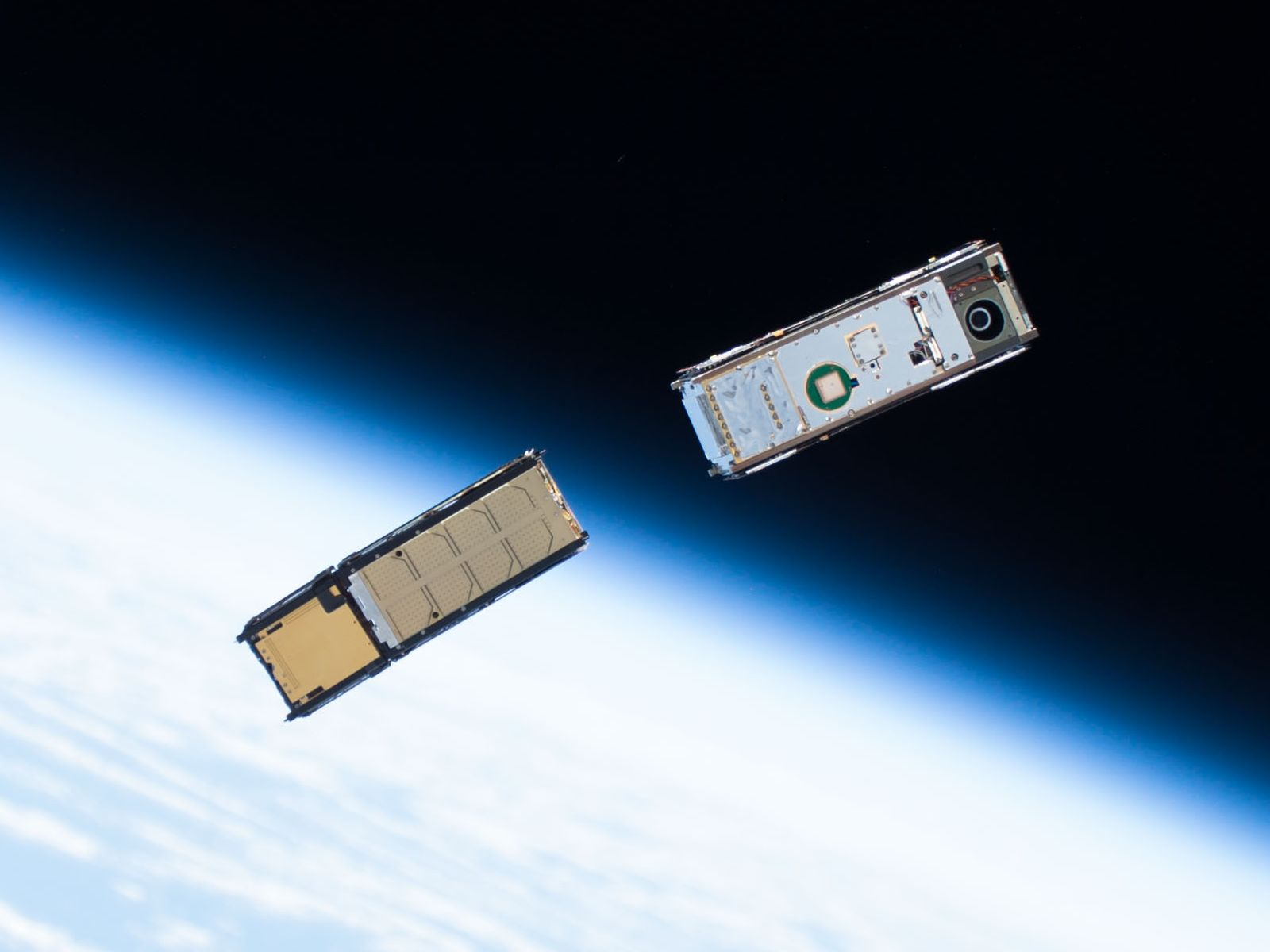
Two CubeSats orbiting around Earth after being deployed from the ISS Kibō module's Small Satellite Orbital Deployer

A European Space Agency rendered video of a likely atmospheric entry in 2024 of the Salsa satellite from the Cluster mission. The satellite was targeted to reenter the atmosphere over the spacecraft cemetery in the South Pacific.

Artificial satellites are human-made spacecraft placed into orbit around Earth or another celestial body. They are distinct from natural satellites such as moons, and from space probes that travel beyond Earth orbit or between planetary bodies. Artificial satellites operate as part of wider satellite systems that may include a satellite bus, payload, ground segment, launch vehicle, tracking network, and regulatory framework.

Artificial satellites are used for communications, navigation, Earth observation, weather monitoring, scientific research, military support, intelligence gathering, astronomy, and technology demonstration. They occupy many types of orbits, including low Earth orbit, medium Earth orbit, geostationary orbit, Sun-synchronous orbit, polar orbit, highly elliptical orbit, Lagrange-point orbits, and orbits around the Moon, Mars, and other Solar System bodies.

== Essence of satellites ==
Artificial satellites are spacecraft placed in orbit to perform functions through a payload, supported by a satellite bus, ground segment, and wider satellite systems. Satellites are defined by their primary body, their orbital motion, and their distinction from natural satellites, space probes, space stations, orbital debris, and other kinds of spacecraft. Satellites make up the vast majority of modern space missions and launches.

=== Basic satellite functions ===
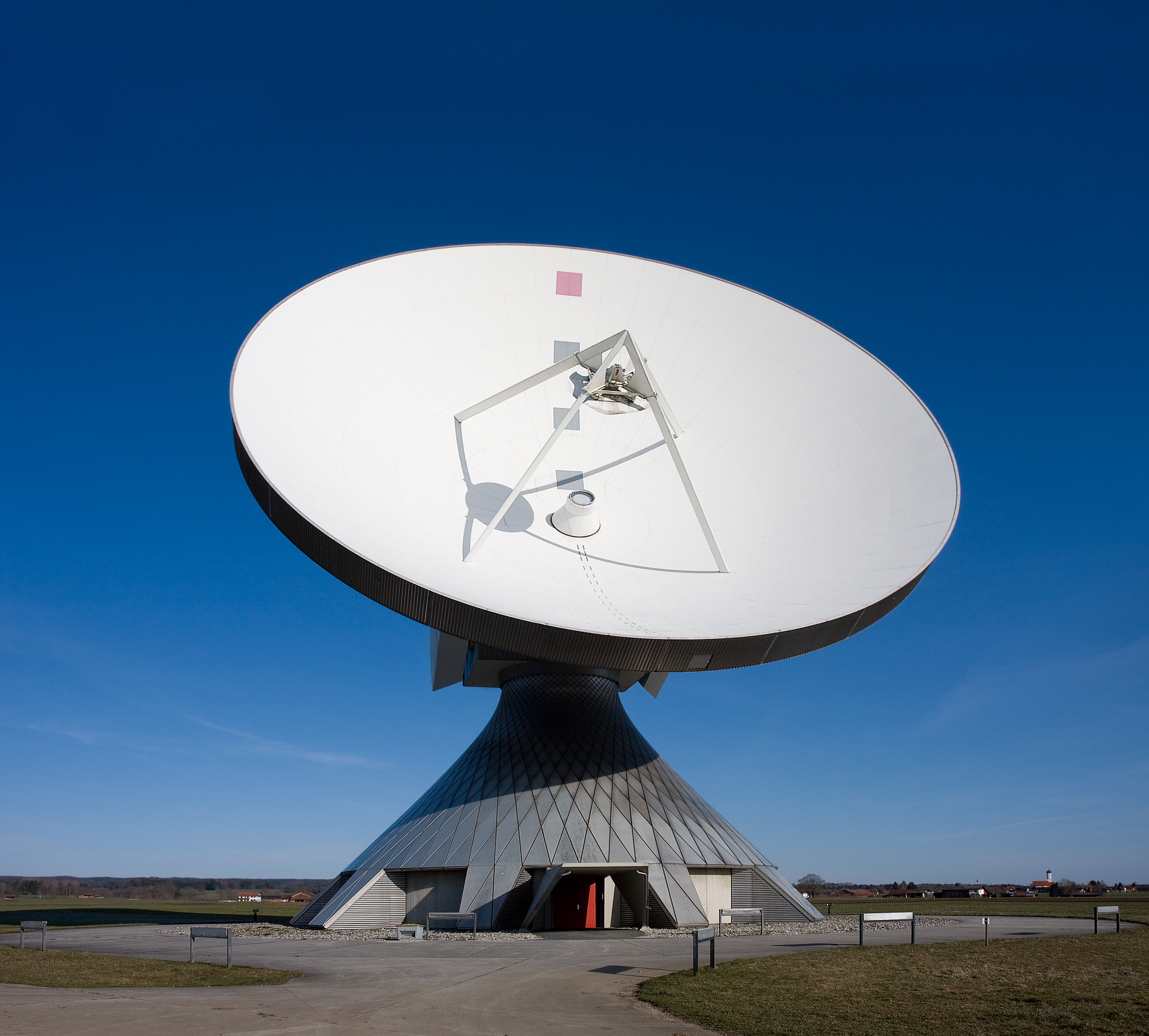
Earth station at the satellite communication facility Raisting Earth Station in Raisting, Bavaria, Germany

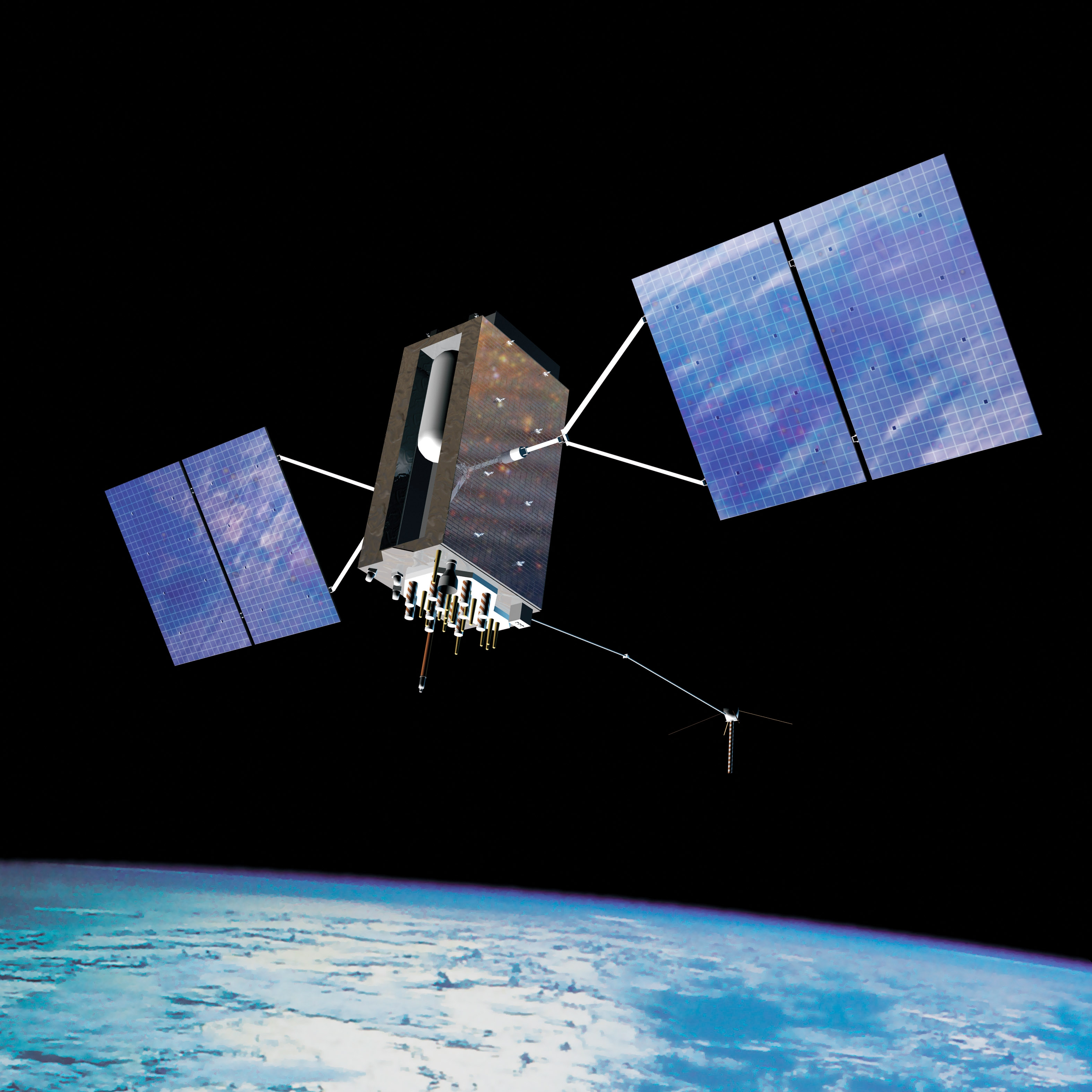
The US Space Force's GPS was both the first global satellite navigation system and to be provided as a free global service.

- Communications
  - Communications satellite – Artificial satellite that relays radio signals.
  - Telecommunications – Transmission of information electromagnetically.
  - Tracking and data relay satellite – American communications satellite.
- Military support
  - Early warning satellite – Ballistic missile detection satellite.
  - Military communications – Messages within armed forces.
  - Military satellite – Artificial satellite used for military purposes.
  - Reconnaissance satellite – Satellite that covertly collects data for intelligence or military applications.
- Navigation
  - Geopositioning – Determination of the geographic position of an object.
    - Global navigation satellite system - Satellites that provide signals for geopositioning.
      - Satellite navigation – Use of satellite signals for navigation or geo-spatial positioning.
- Observation
  - Remote sensing – Obtaining information through non-contact sensors.
    - Earth observation satellite – Satellite designed to observe Earth from orbit.
      - Satellite imagery – Images taken from an artificial satellite.
- Scientific measurement
  - Space physics – Study of space plasmas in the Solar System.
  - Space telescope – Instrument in space to study astronomical objects.
- Technology demonstration
  - CubeSat – Miniature satellite in 10 cm cube modules.
  - Technology demonstration satellite – Showcasing an idea for new technology.
- Timing
  - Precise Time and Time Interval – Standard for highly accurate timing information.
  - Time and frequency transfer – Scheme where multiple sites share a precise reference time or frequency.

=== Core concepts ===
- Artificial satellite
  - Satellite – Objects intentionally placed into orbit
  - Sputnik 1 – First artificial Earth satellite
- Orbit
  - Kepler's laws of planetary motion – Laws describing planetary orbits
  - Orbit – Curved path of an object around a point
  - Orbital mechanics – Field of classical mechanics concerned with the motion of spacecraft
  - Orbital period – Time an astronomical object takes to complete one orbit around another object
- Payload
  - Payload – Carrying capacity of a vehicle
  - Satellite bus – Main body and structural component of the satellite
- Primary body
  - Barycenter – Center of mass of multiple bodies orbiting each other
  - Primary body – Prime astronomical designated entity within a gravitational system

=== Satellite ===
- Satellite – Objects intentionally placed into orbit
  - Artificial satellite – Objects intentionally placed into orbit
  - List of natural satellites
  - Natural satellite – Astronomical body that orbits a planet

=== Satellite system ===
The GPS constellation calls for 24 satellites to be distributed equally on six orbital planes. The number of satellites in view from a given point on the Earth's surface, in this example at 40°N, changes with time.

- Ground segment – Ground-based elements of a spacecraft system
- Satellite constellation – Group of artificial satellites working together as a system
- Spacecraft
  - Spacecraft – Vehicle or machine designed to fly in space
  - Spacecraft design
  - Uncrewed spacecraft – Spacecraft without people on board

=== Fundamental distinctions ===
- Natural and artificial satellites
  - Artificial satellite – Objects intentionally placed into orbit
  - Moon – Natural satellite orbiting Earth
  - Natural satellite – Astronomical body that orbits a planet
- Satellites and orbital debris
  - Derelict spacecraft – Pollution around Earth by defunct artificial objects
  - Graveyard orbit – Spacecraft end-of-life orbit
  - Kessler syndrome – Theoretical satellite collision cascade
  - Orbital debris – Pollution around Earth by defunct artificial objects
  - Space debris – Pollution around Earth by defunct artificial objects
- Satellites and space probes
  - Flyby (spaceflight) – Flight event at some distance from the object
  - Interplanetary probe – Unmanned robotic spacecraft
  - Spacecraft – Vehicle or machine designed to fly in space
  - Space probe – Unmanned robotic spacecraft
- Satellites and space stations
  - International Space Station – Modular space station in low Earth orbit
  - Mir – Soviet/Russian space station (1986–2001)
  - Skylab – First space station launched and operated by NASA (1973–1979)
  - Space station – Habitable artificial satellite
  - Tiangong space station – Chinese modular space station (since 2021)
- Satellites and spacecraft
  - Crewed spacecraft – Spacecraft with life-support systems
  - Robotic spacecraft – Spacecraft without people on board
  - Spacecraft – Vehicle or machine designed to fly in space
  - Uncrewed spacecraft – Spacecraft without people on board

== Applications ==
Artificial satellites are used across civil, commercial, scientific, and military fields. Major applications include astronomy, communications, Earth observation, remote sensing, satellite navigation, weather monitoring, military support, and educational or amateur spaceflight.

=== Astronomy and space science ===
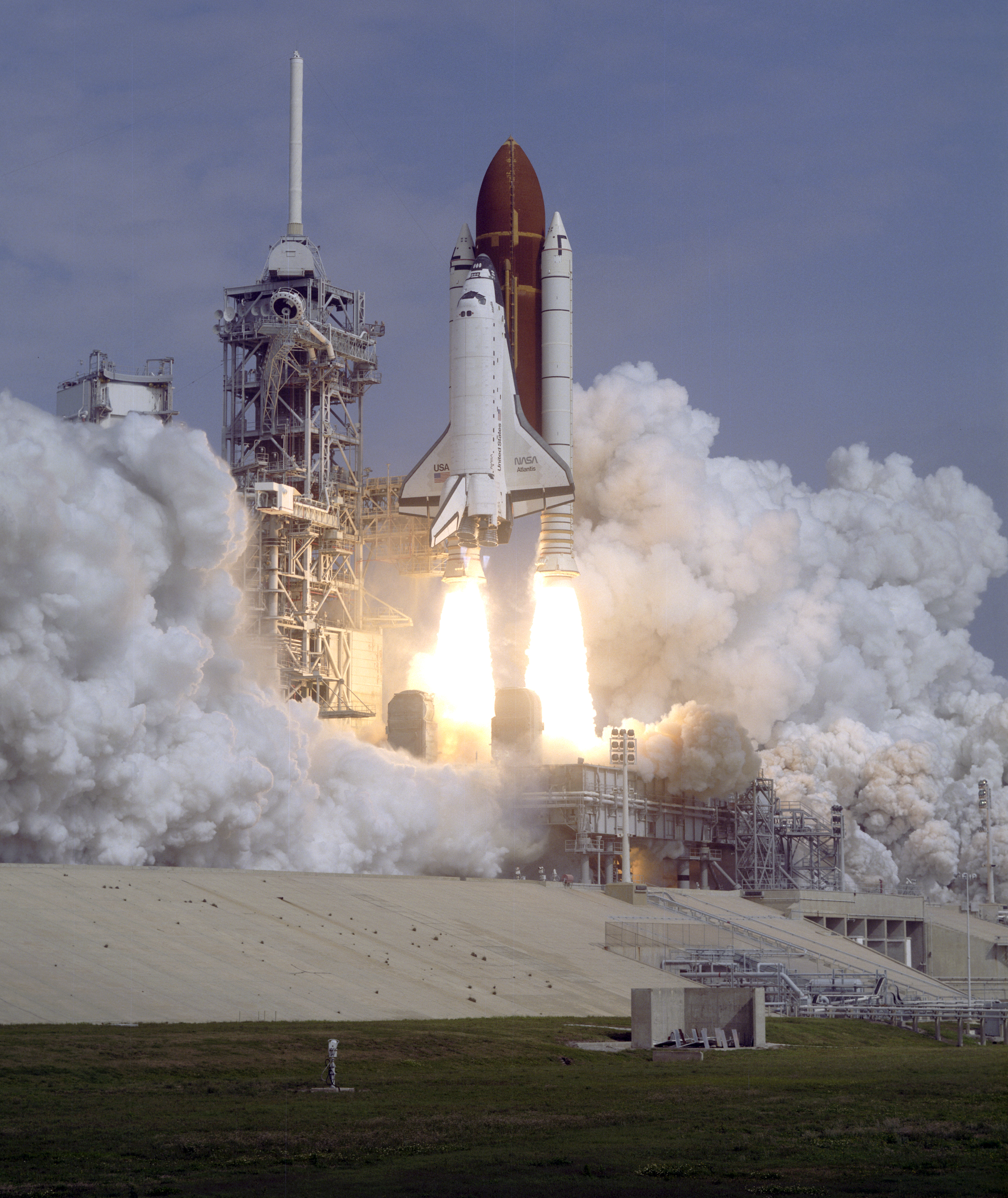
Launch of Space Shuttle Atlantis carrying the CGRO observatory to Earth orbit (STS-37)

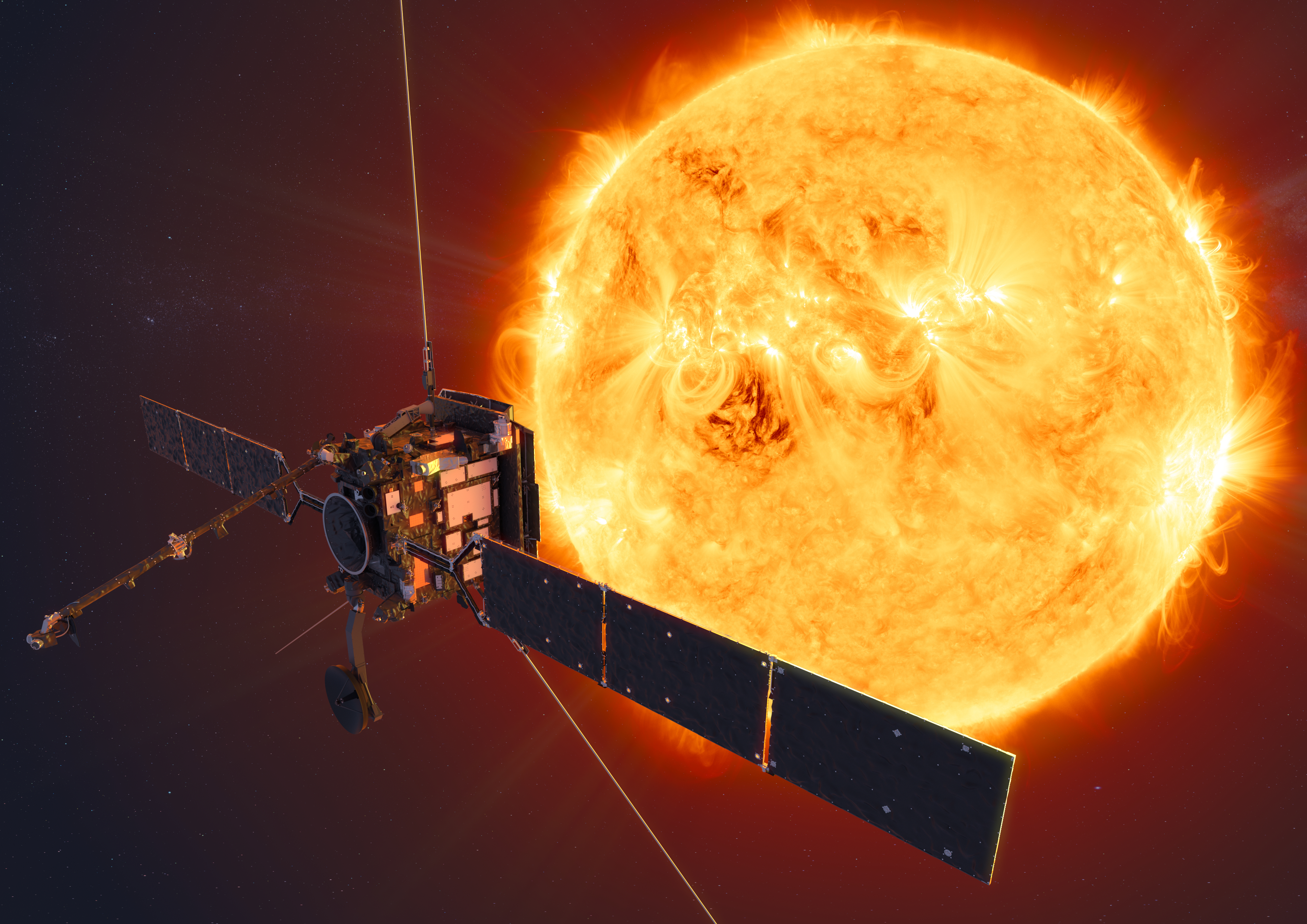
Artist's impression of the Solar Orbiter orbiting the Sun.

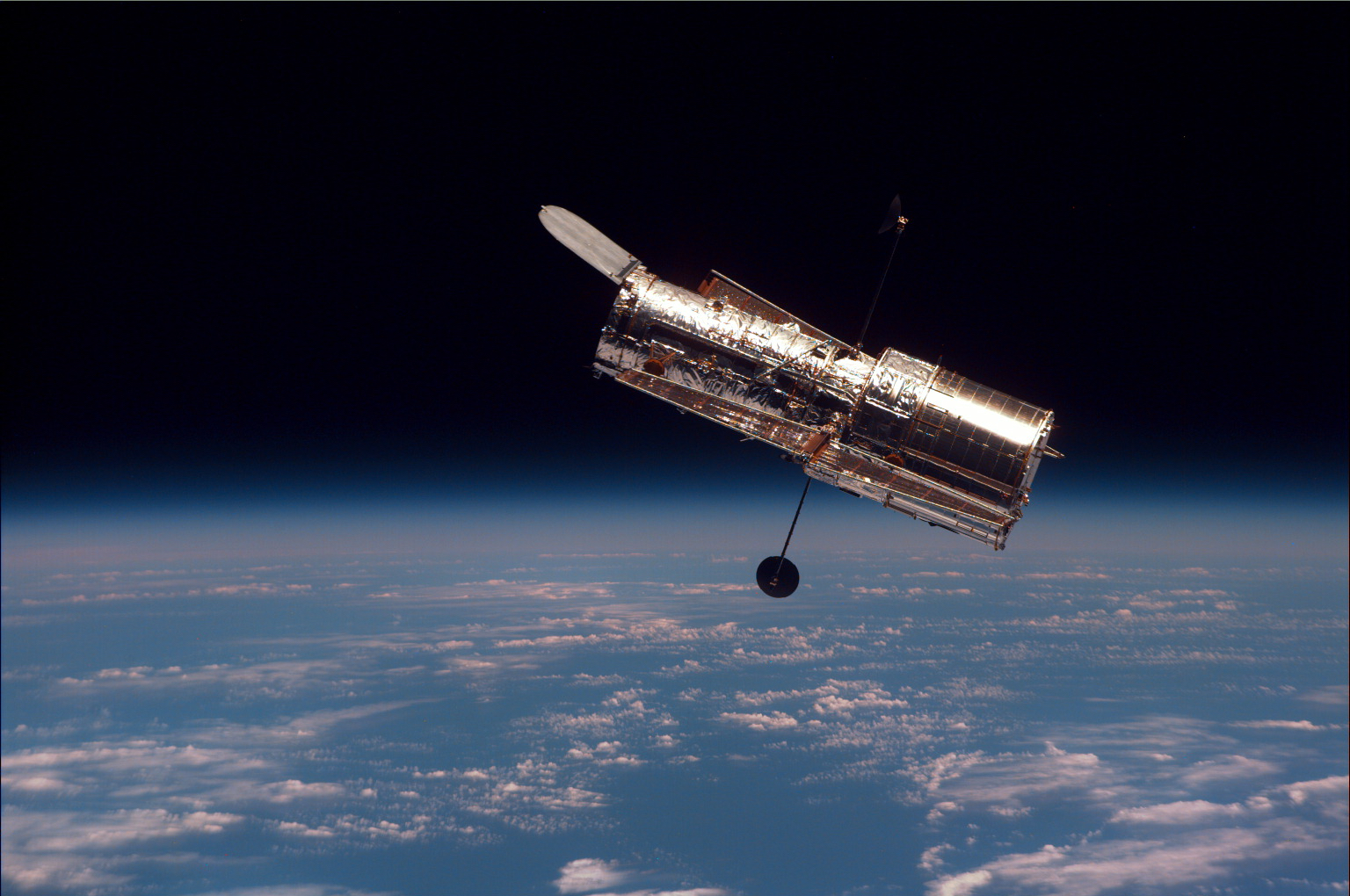
The Hubble Space Telescope.

Satellites support astronomy and space science by carrying instruments above Earth's atmosphere, observing wavelengths and environments that are difficult or impossible to study from the ground. Major scientific uses include space telescope observations, cosmic microwave background mapping, gamma-ray astronomy, infrared astronomy, X-ray astronomy, planetary science, solar observation, and space physics.

- Satellite system (astronomy)
  - Cosmic microwave background missions
    - Cosmic Background Explorer - NASA satellite of the Explorer program.
    - Cosmic microwave background – Trace radiation from the early universe..
    - Lambda-CDM model – Mathematical model of the Big Bang.
    - Planck (spacecraft) - Space observatory.
    - Wilkinson Microwave Anisotropy Probe – NASA satellite of the Explorer program.
  - Gamma-ray observatories
    - AGILE (satellite) – X-ray and gamma ray astronomical satellite.
    - Compton Gamma Ray Observatory – NASA space observatory designed to detect X-rays and gamma rays (1991–2000).
    - Compton Spectrometer and Imager – Space observatory to study gamma rays.
    - Gamma-ray astronomy – Observational astronomy performed with gamma rays
    - Gamma-ray Burst Monitor – Space telescope for gamma-ray astronomy launched in 2008
    - INTEGRAL – European space telescope for observing gamma rays
  - Infrared observatories
    - Akari (satellite) – Infrared astronomy satellite developed by Japan Aerospace Exploration Agency
    - Infrared astronomy – Observation of infrared wavelengths
    - Infrared Space Observatory – Orbital satellite telescope
    - IRAS – Infrared space observatory
    - Wide-field Infrared Survey Explorer – NASA satellite of the Explorer program
  - Planetary science orbiters
    - 2001 Mars Odyssey – NASA orbiter for geology and hydrology
    - Akatsuki (spacecraft) – Japanese orbiter mission to Venus (2010–2024)
    - BepiColombo – ESA/JAXA mission to study Mercury in orbit (2018–present)
    - Cassini–Huygens – Mission to Saturn (1997–2017)
    - Chandrayaan-2 – Indian lunar mission (2019–Present)
    - Juno (spacecraft) – Second NASA orbiter mission to Jupiter (2011–Present)
    - Lunar Reconnaissance Orbiter – NASA robotic spacecraft orbiting the moon
    - Mars Express – European orbiter mission to Mars (2003–present)
    - Mars Reconnaissance Orbiter – NASA spacecraft active since 2005
    - MAVEN – NASA Mars orbiter (2013–2025)
    - MESSENGER – NASA mission to Mercury
    - Planetary science – Science of planets and planetary systems
    - Venus Express – European orbiter mission to Venus (2005–2015)
  - Solar observatories
    - Hinode (satellite) – Japanese satellite
    - Parker Solar Probe – NASA probe of the Sun's outer corona
    - Solar and Heliospheric Observatory – European space observatory
    - Solar Dynamics Observatory – NASA mission, launched in 2010 to GSO
    - Solar Orbiter – European space-based solar observatory
    - STEREO – Solar observation mission (2006–present)
  - Space physics and magnetospheric satellites
    - Advanced Composition Explorer – NASA satellite of the Explorer program, at SE-L1 from 1997
    - Atmospheric Neutral Density Experiment – Space experiment satellite
    - C/NOFS – U.S. Air Force communications outage prediction satellite (2008–2015)
    - Cluster II (spacecraft) – European Space Agency space mission
    - Colorado Inner Radiation Belt Experiment
    - Colorado Student Space Weather Experiment
    - CRRES – NASA satellite
    - Double Star (satellite) – Chinese-European joint satellite
    - Drag and Atmospheric Neutral Density Explorer
    - Dual Air Density Explorer – NASA satellite of the Explorer program
    - Dynamics Explorer – NASA satellite of the Explorers Program
    - ELFIN – University of California, Los Angeles developed cubesats
    - Geotail – NASA/ISAS spacecraft
    - IMAGE (spacecraft) – NASA satellite of the Explorer program
    - Interstellar Boundary Explorer – NASA satellite of the Explorer program
    - Magnetospheric Multiscale Mission – Four NASA robots studying Earth's magnetosphere (2015–present)
    - Polar (satellite) – NASA science spacecraft which studied the polar magnetosphere until 2008
    - Space physics – Study of space plasmas in the Solar System
    - THEMIS – NASA satellite of the Explorer program
    - Van Allen Probes – NASA Earth magnetosphere investigator satellites
  - Space telescopes
    - List of space telescopes
      - Chandra X-ray Observatory – NASA space telescope launched in 1999
      - Fermi Gamma-ray Space Telescope – Space telescope for gamma-ray astronomy launched in 2008
      - Hubble Space Telescope – NASA/ESA space telescope launched in 1990
      - James Webb Space Telescope – NASA/ESA/CSA space telescope launched in 2021
      - Space telescope – Instrument in space to study astronomical objects
      - Spitzer Space Telescope – NASA infrared space telescope (2003–2020)
      - XMM-Newton – X-ray space observatory
  - X-ray observatories
    - Advanced Satellite for Cosmology and Astrophysics – Japanese cosmic X-ray astronomy mission
    - BeppoSAX – Italian-Dutch satellite used for X-ray astronomy
    - Neil Gehrels Swift Observatory – NASA satellite of the Explorer program
    - NuSTAR – NASA X-ray space telescope of the Explorer program
    - X-ray astronomy – Branch of astronomy that uses X-ray observation

=== Communications ===
Clip of the international broadcast of the first Moon landing, Neil Armstrong making humanity's first step onto an extraterrestrial body, transmitted from Honeysuckle Creek Tracking Station and distributed globally via the Intelsat III F-4 satellite.

Communications satellites relay voice, video, data, Internet, broadcast, mobile, and emergency communications through links between Earth stations, user terminals, and other spacecraft. Major communications applications include fixed-satellite service, mobile satellite service, satellite television, satellite radio, satellite Internet access, direct-to-device services, inter-satellite links, and satellite-aided search and rescue.

- Fixed-satellite service
  - Fixed-satellite service – Telecommunication subcategory
  - Standards
    - DVB-S – 1995 digital TV standard for satellite television
    - DVB-S2 – Digital satellite television standard
  - Ground equipment
    - Satellite modem – Type of modem
    - Very-small-aperture terminal – Satellite communication system with small dish antenna
- Mobile-satellite service
  - Broadband Global Area Network – Global satellite network
  - Globalstar – Global satellite telecommunications company
  - Inmarsat – British satellite communications company
  - Iridium Communications – American satellite communications company
    - Iridium satellite constellation – Satellite constellation providing voice and data coverage
  - Marisat – Series of communications satellites
  - Mobile satellite service – Service for mobile phones to communicate with satellites
  - Orbcomm – American wireless networking and telecommunications company
  - Satellite phone – Type of mobile phone
  - Thuraya – UAE-based satellite telecommunications company
- Broadcasting-satellite service
  - Satellite television – Broadcasting of television using artificial satellites
  - Satellite radio
    - 1worldspace – Defunct satellite radio network
    - Satellite radio – Broadcasting-satellite service
    - SiriusXM – American radio broadcasting corporation
    - WorldSpace – Defunct satellite radio network
- Satellite Internet

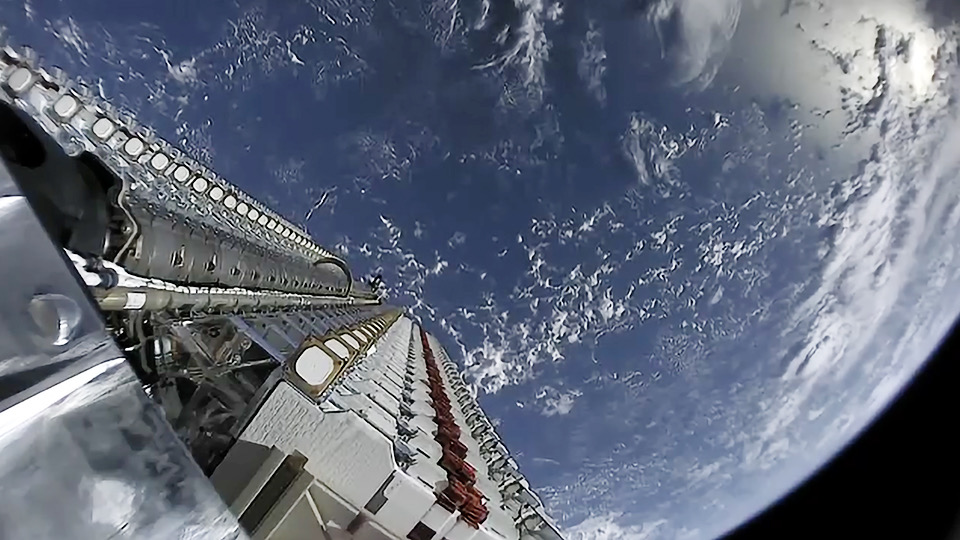
The first batch of 60 Starlink satellites stacked together before deployment on 24 May 2019.

  - Amazon Leo – Amazon satellite constellation and internet service
  - Eutelsat OneWeb – Global communications company
  - IRIS² - European military and government communications constellation
  - O3b – Group of telecommunications satellites
  - Satellite Internet access – Satellite-provided Internet
  - Starlink – SpaceX satellite Internet constellation
  - Telesat – Canadian satellite communications company
  - Direct-to-device
    - AST SpaceMobile – American satellite manufacturer
    - Lynk Global – American satellite communications company
- Inter-satellite links
  - Inter-satellite service – Radiocommunication between artificial satellites
  - Laser communication in space – Communication using lasers in outer space
  - Tracking and Data Relay Satellite System – Network of American communications satellites
- Emergency communications
  - Emergency communication system – Communication system used for emergency coordination
  - International Cospas-Sarsat Programme – International satellite-aided search and rescue initiative

=== Earth observation and remote sensing ===
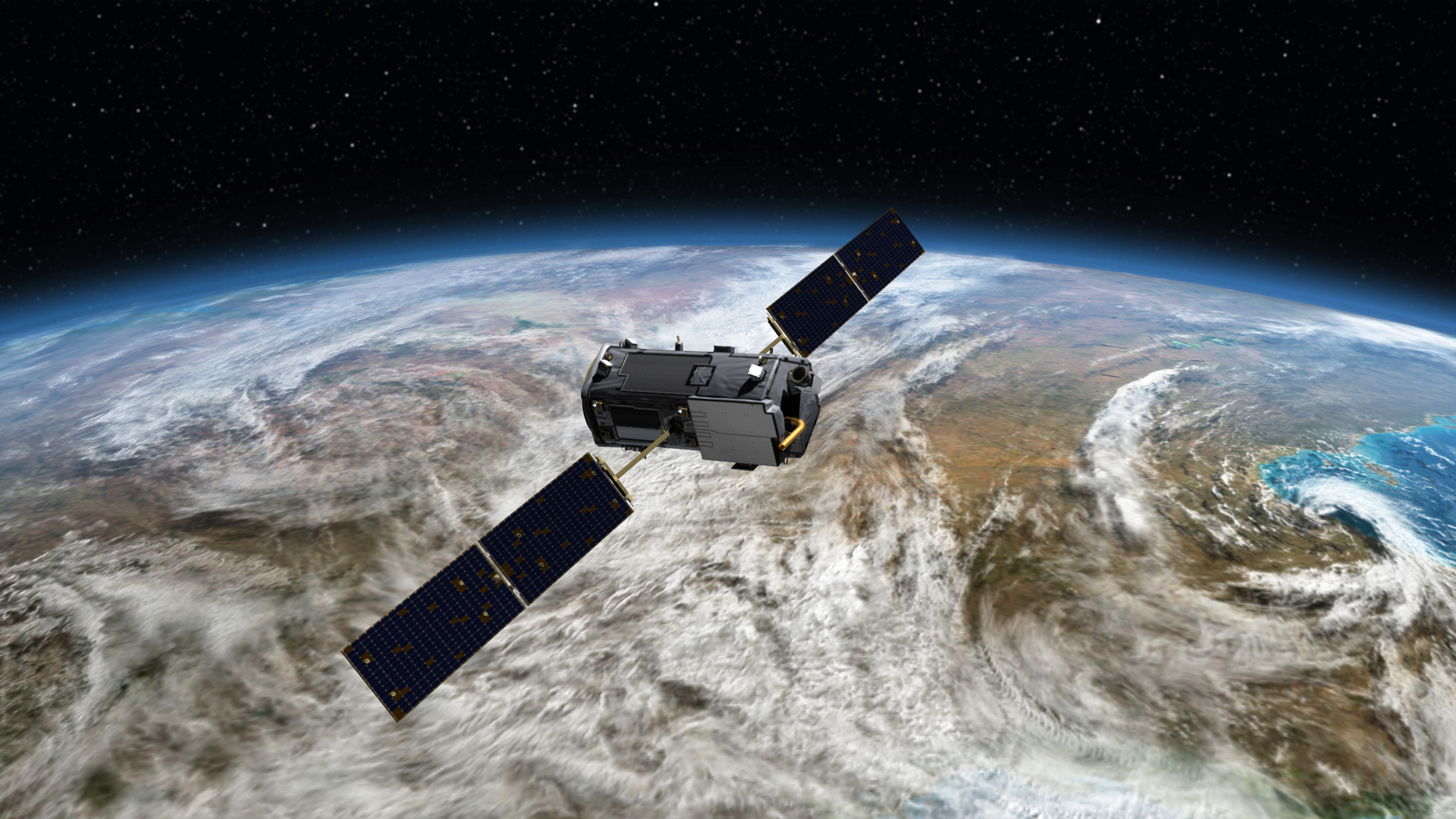
Artist's conception of OCO-2, the second successful high precision (better than 0.3%) CO_{2} observing satellite.

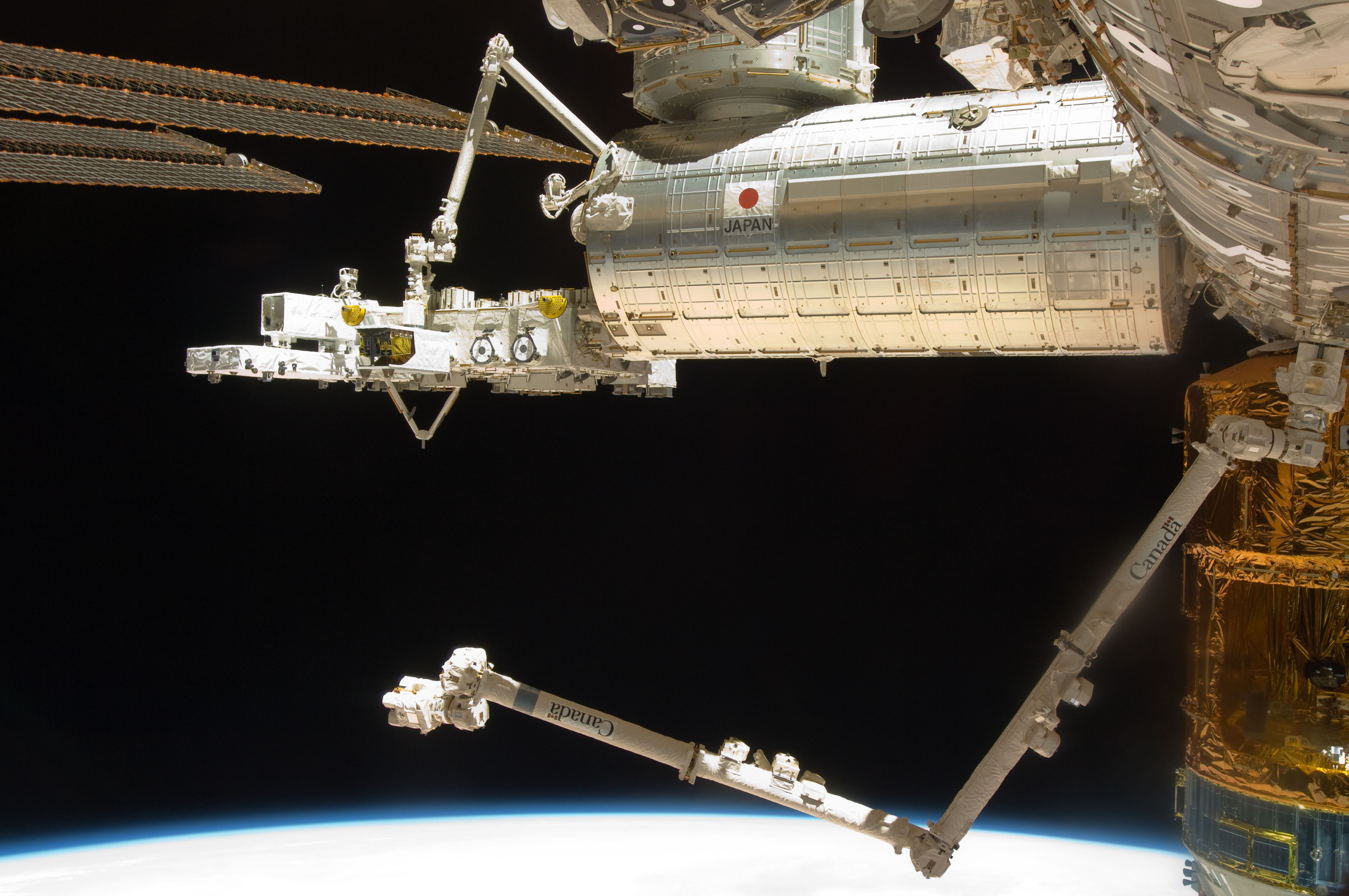
The Hyperspectral Imager for the Coastal Ocean (HICO) on the International Space Station.

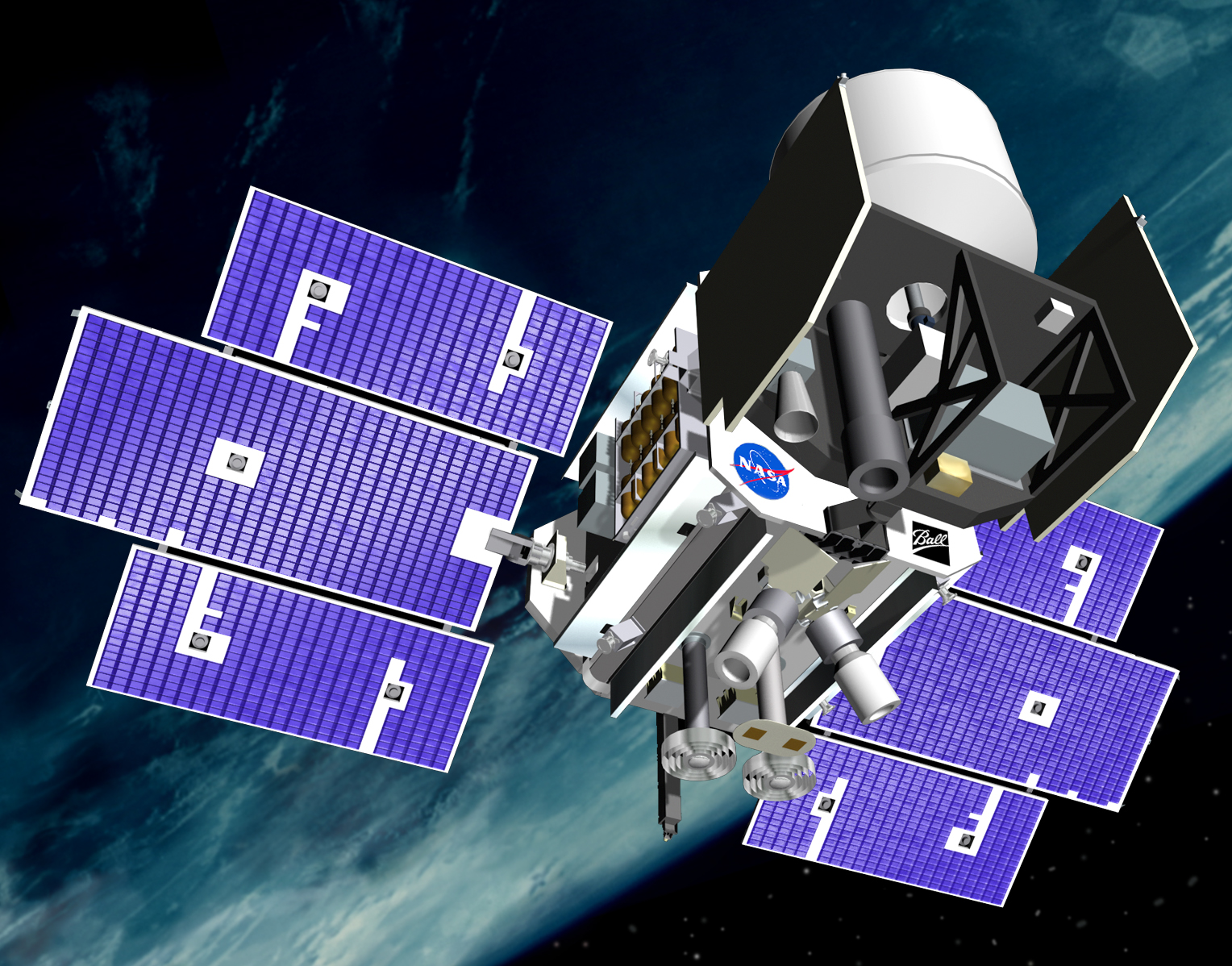
Artist's rendering of the ICESat-1 satellite.

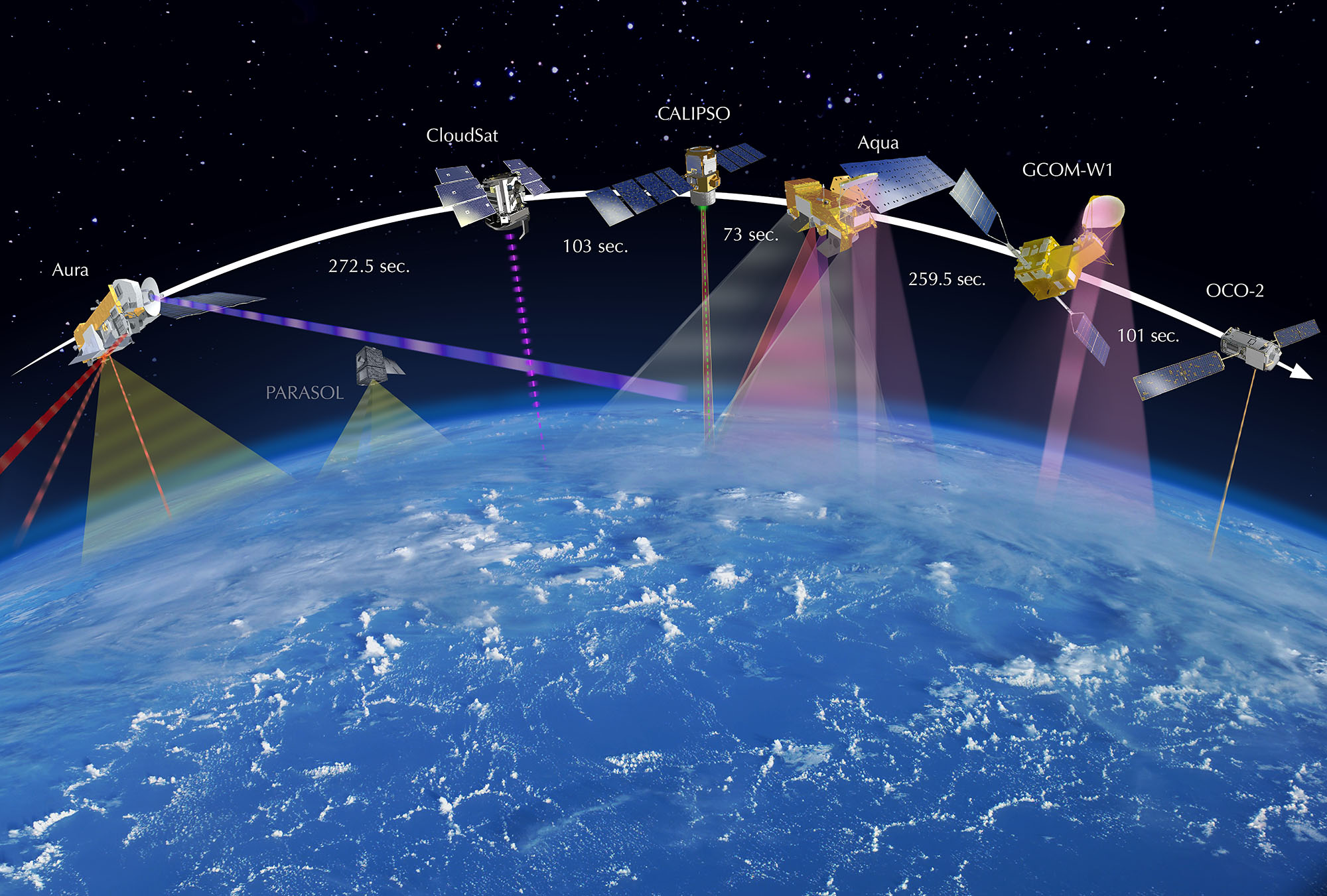
Six Earth observation satellites comprising the A-train satellite constellation as of 2014.

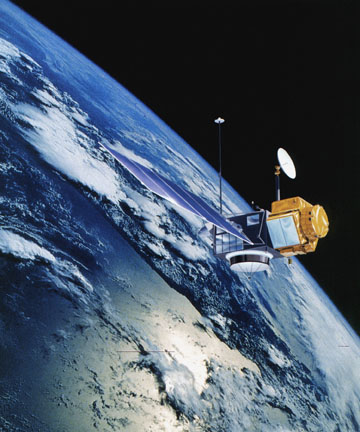
Artist's rendering of the TOPEX/Poseidon satellite.

Earth observation satellites and remote sensing satellites collect data about Earth's land, oceans, atmosphere, ice, climate, and human activity. Their applications include precision agriculture, climate monitoring, disaster response, environmental monitoring, hyperspectral imaging, laser altimetry, multispectral imaging, oceanography, synthetic-aperture radar, and urban planning.

- Agricultural monitoring
  - Enhanced vegetation index – Index for improving vegetation monitoring
  - EuCROPIS – German satellite
  - Normalized difference vegetation index – Metric quantifying vegetation density
  - Precision agriculture – Farming management strategy
- Climate monitoring
  - Climate Data Record
  - Clouds and the Earth's Radiant Energy System – NASA satellite climate data instruments
  - Copernicus Climate Change Service – European Union scientific programme
  - Greenhouse gas monitoring – Measurement of greenhouse gas emissions and levels
  - Space-based measurements of carbon dioxide – Used to help answer questions about Earth's carbon cycle
- Disaster monitoring
  - Disaster Monitoring Constellation – Satellite constellation
  - Flood – Water overflow submerging usually-dry land
  - International Charter Space and Major Disasters – Non-binding multinational alliance
  - Wildfire – Uncontrolled fire in forests or open spaces
- Environmental monitoring
  - Air pollution – Presence of dangerous substances in the air
  - Deforestation – Conversion of forest to non-forest for human use
  - Environmental monitoring – Monitoring of the quality of the environment
  - Global Forest Change dataset – Landsat-based dataset of global tree cover change
  - Multi-Angle Imager for Aerosols
  - Ozone monitoring instrument – Earth observation satellite
  - Total Ozone Mapping Spectrometer
- Hyperspectral imaging
  - Airborne visible/infrared imaging spectrometer
  - Hyperspectral Imager for the Coastal Ocean – Observation sensor on the International Space Station
  - Hyperspectral imaging – Multi-wavelength imaging method
  - Imaging spectrometer
  - Spectrometer – Used to measure spectral components of light
- Ice monitoring
  - Arctic Weather Satellite – European weather satellite
  - CryoSat – ESA programme monitoring polar ice using satellites
  - CryoSat-2 – European Space Agency environmental research satellite
  - Cryosphere – Earth's surface where water is frozen
  - Glacier – Persistent body of ice that moves downhill under its own weight
  - Ice sheet – Large mass of glacial ice
  - Sea ice – Outcome of seawater as it freezes
- Land observation
  - Advanced Land Observing Satellite – Japanese earth observation satellite (2006–2011)
  - GRACE – Joint American-German space mission to map Earth's gravitational field
  - GRACE-FO – Joint American-German space mission to map Earth's gravitational field
  - Land cover – Physical material covering the surface of Earth
  - Land use – Classification of land resources based on what can be built and on its use
  - Soil moisture – Water content of the soil
  - Soil Moisture Active Passive – NASA earth monitoring satellite
  - Soil Moisture and Ocean Salinity – ESA earth observation satellite
- Laser altimetry
  - Digital elevation model – 3D computer-generated imagery and measurements of terrain
  - ICESat – NASA satellite to observe ice sheets, clouds, and land (2003–2010)
  - ICESat-2 – NASA Earth observation satellite
  - Lidar – Method of spatial measurement using laser
- Multispectral imaging
  - Advanced Land Imager – Former Earth Observation Satellite
  - Advanced Spaceborne Thermal Emission and Reflection Radiometer – Japanese imaging device aboard NASA's Terra satellite
  - Advanced Very-High-Resolution Radiometer – Space-borne earth reflectance sensor
  - Aqua (satellite) – NASA scientific research satellite (2002–present)
  - Envisat – ESA Earth observation satellite (2002–2012)
  - Moderate Resolution Imaging Spectroradiometer – Payload imaging sensor
  - Multispectral imaging – Capturing image data across multiple electromagnetic spectrum ranges
  - Multispectral Unit for Land Assessment – Future Filipino Earth observations satellite
  - Suomi NPP – American Earth weather satellite (2011–present)
  - Terra (satellite) – NASA climate research satellite (1999–present)
- Ocean observation
  - Coastal zone color scanner – Satellite device designed for detecting water on Earth
  - Ocean color – Explanation of the color of oceans and ocean color remote sensing
  - Ocean surface topography – Shape of the ocean surface relative to the geoid
  - Oceanography – Scientific study of the ocean
  - Plankton, Aerosol, Cloud, ocean Ecosystem – NASA Earth observation satellite
  - Scatterometer – Meteorological instrumentation
  - Sea surface temperature – Water temperature close to the ocean's surface
  - Soil Moisture and Ocean Salinity – ESA earth observation satellite
- Optical imaging
  - Aerial photographic and satellite image interpretation – Remote sensing processing
  - Earth observation satellite – Satellite designed to observe Earth from orbit
  - Earth Polychromatic Imaging Camera – American solar research spacecraft
  - Landsat program – American network of Earth-observing satellites for international research purposes
    - Landsat 1 – American earth observation satellite (1972–1978)
    - Landsat 7 – American earth observation satellite (1999–2025)
    - Landsat 8 – American earth observation satellite
    - Landsat 9 – American earth observation satellite
  - Operational Land Imager – Sensing instrument aboard the Landsat 8 satellite orbiting Earth
  - Remote sensing – Obtaining information through non-contact sensors
  - Satellite imagery – Images taken from an artificial satellite
  - Sentinel-2 – Earth observation mission
- Radar altimetry
  - Jason satellite series – Series of Earth observation satellites
  - Radar altimeter – Measures an aircraft's height above the terrain
  - SARAL – Indian earth observation satellite
  - Sea surface height – Shape of the ocean surface relative to the geoid
  - TOPEX/Poseidon – Satellite mission to map ocean surface topography
- Synthetic-aperture radar
  - COSMO-SkyMed – Italian radar observation satellite system
  - Envisat – ESA Earth observation satellite (2002–2012)
  - Interferometric synthetic-aperture radar – Geodesy and remote sensing technique
  - Ka-band Radar Interferometer – NASA/CNES oceanography mission (2022–present)
  - NISAR (satellite) – Joint NASA-ISRO synthetic radar aperture spacecraft
  - RADARSAT
    - Radarsat-1 – Canadian Earth observation satellite (1995–2013)
    - Radarsat-2 – Canadian earth observation satellite
  - RADARSAT Constellation – Canadian satellite fleet
  - SAR-Lupe – German military reconnaissance satellite system
  - Sentinel-1 – Earth observation satellite
  - Space-based radar – Use of radar systems mounted on satellites
  - Spaceborne Imaging Radar – NASA radar
  - Synthetic-aperture radar – Form of radar used to create images of landscapes
  - TerraSAR-X – German Earth observation satellite
- Urban monitoring
  - Urban heat island – Situation where cities are warmer than surrounding areas
  - Urban planning – Technical process of land use and urban design

=== Education, amateur, and student satellites ===
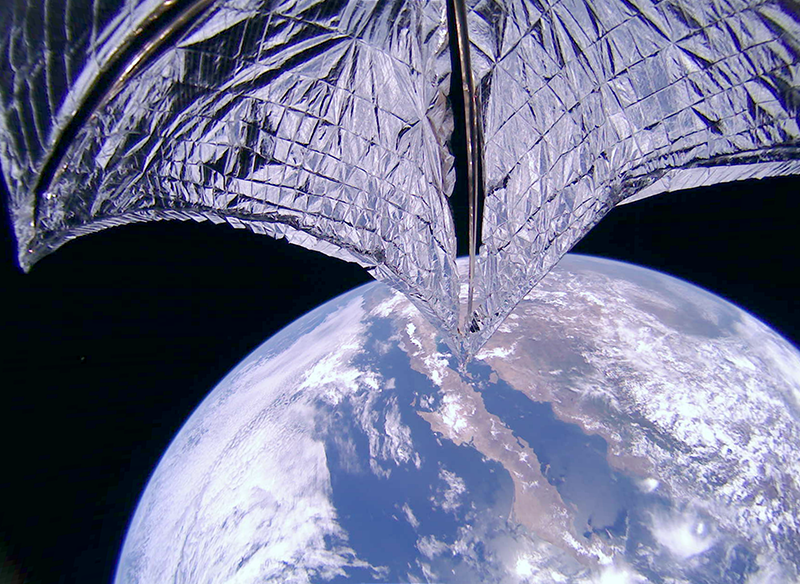
LightSail 2 with deployed solar sail in space, 23 July 2019.

Educational, amateur, and student satellites use small spacecraft to support amateur radio, hands-on engineering, classroom projects, university missions, citizen science, biological research, and low-cost technology demonstrations. Many are CubeSats or other small satellites developed by universities, nonprofit organizations, student teams, or amateur radio groups.

- Amateur radio and educational satellites
  - Amateur radio satellite – Type of satellite that transmits over amateur radio frequencies
  - AMSAT – Amateur radio satellite organizations
  - AMSAT-OSCAR 6
  - AMSAT-OSCAR 7 – 1974 amateur radio satellite
  - AMSAT-OSCAR 10 – Star-shaped German AMSAT micro-satellite
  - AMSAT-OSCAR 51
  - FUNcube-1 – Educational CubeSat satellite
  - OSCAR (satellite) – Designation of amateur radio satellites
  - SAPPHIRE – U.S. amateur radio satellite
- Citizen-science and crowdfunded satellites
  - Citizen science – Amateur scientific research
  - Crowdfunding – Collection of finance from backers to fund an initiative
  - LightSail – LEO solar sailing demo project
  - NanoSail-D – Satellite designed to test the concept of solar sails that deployed unsuccessfully
  - The Planetary Society – US-based non-governmental organization
- Educational payloads
  - Bion-M No.1 – Russian space mission
  - BioSentinel – US experimental astrobiology research satellite
  - GeneSat-1 – NASA cubesat
  - Student Space Exploration & Technology Initiative
- University and student satellites
  - Aalto-1 – Finnish research nanosatellite
  - AAU CubeSat – CubeSat built and operated by Aalborg University, Denmark
  - AAUSat-2 – CubeSat built and operated by Aalborg University, Denmark
  - AAUSat-3 – CubeSat built and operated by Aalborg University, Denmark
  - ArduSat – Arduino-based CubeSat science project
  - BRICSat-2 – Experimental amateur radio satellite
  - BRICSat-P – United States technology demonstration and amateur radio cubesat
  - CanSat – Sounding rocket payload used to teach space technology
  - Cornell University Satellite – American technology demonstration satellite
  - CubeSat – Miniature satellite in 10 cm cube modules
  - Delfi-C3 – Dutch mini-satellite
  - Delfi-n3Xt – Dutch nanosatellite
  - EQUiSat
  - KickSat – Citizen science project
  - KySat-1 – American satellite
  - Quakesat – Earth Observation nanosatellite

=== Military and intelligence ===
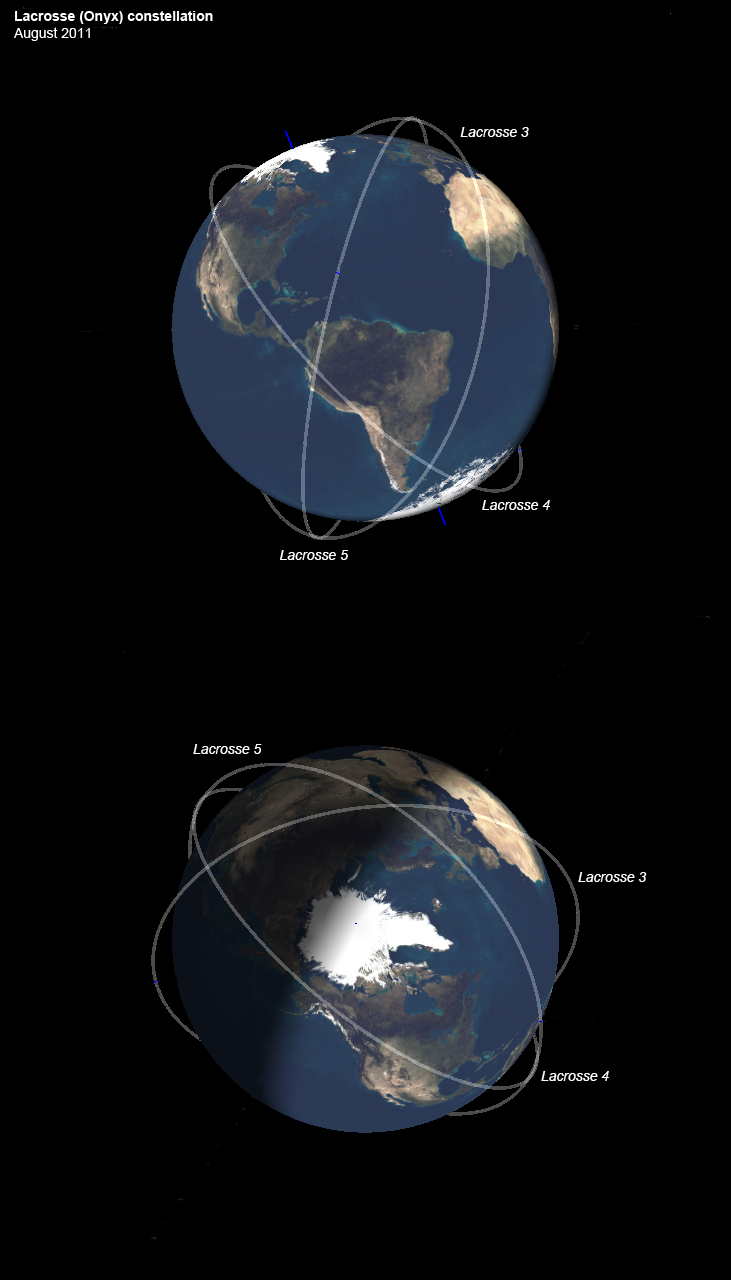
The constellation of the Lacrosse (Onyx) SAR satellites in orbit as of August 2011.

Military and intelligence satellites support military communications, missile warning, reconnaissance, signals intelligence, maritime domain awareness, and space domain awareness. This area also includes anti-satellite weapons and other counterspace systems intended to disable, destroy, inspect, or interfere with satellites and other space assets.

- Anti-satellite systems

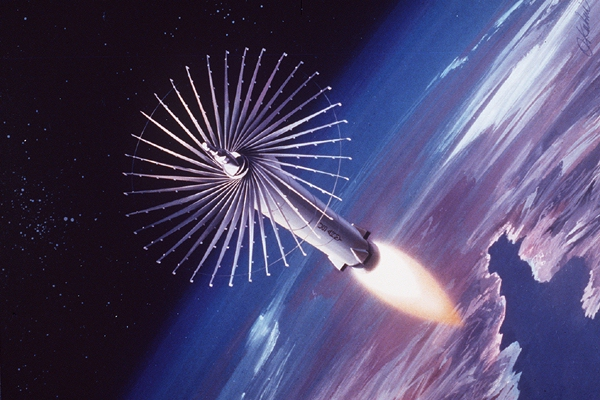
An artist's impression of a futuristic anti-satellite weapon capable of destroying satellites using "circular saw" extensions.

  - 2007 Chinese anti-satellite missile test – Largest field of space debris in history
  - Anti-satellite weapon – Kinetic energy device designed to destroy satellites in orbit
  - Directed-energy weapon – Type of weapon that fires a concentrated beam of energy at its target
  - Istrebitel Sputnikov – Soviet anti-satellite weapon program
  - Operation Burnt Frost – 2008 military operation to destroy a non-functioning U.S. satellite
  - Project SAINT – US anti-Soviet spacecraft system
- Military communications satellites
  - Advanced Extremely High Frequency – Series of American military communications satellites
  - Defense Satellite Communications System – Defense satellite communications project
  - Milstar – Constellation of American military satellites
  - Skynet (satellite) – Communications satellite
  - Wideband Global SATCOM – Defense satellite communications project
- Missile warning satellites
  - Defense Support Program – US infrared satellite early warning system
  - Early warning satellite – Ballistic missile detection satellite
  - Oko – Soviet (now Russian) satellite-based early warning system for ballistic missiles
  - Space-Based Infrared System – Missile warning and defence system
- Ocean surveillance satellites
  - Legenda (satellite system) – Soviet satellite targeting system
  - US-A – Soviet nuclear-powered surveillance satellite
- Reconnaissance satellites
  - CORONA (satellite) – American reconnaissance satellites (1959–1972)
  - KH-11 KENNEN – Type of American spy satellite
  - Lacrosse (satellite) – Series of American terrestrial radar imaging reconnaissance satellites
  - Military satellite – Artificial satellite used for military purposes
  - National Reconnaissance Office – US intelligence agency in charge of satellite intelligence
  - Reconnaissance satellite – Satellite that covertly collects data for intelligence or military applications
  - Yaogan – Chinese military reconnaissance satellite program
- Signals intelligence
  - Electronic intelligence – Intelligence-gathering by interception of signals
  - Magnum (satellite) – Class of spy satellites of the United States Central Intelligence Agency
  - Mercury (satellite) – Series of United States spy satellites
  - Naval Ocean Surveillance System – Series of signals-intelligence satellites of the U.S. Navy
    - White Cloud – Series of signals-intelligence satellites of the U.S. Navy
  - Olymp-K – Russian military geostationary satellite
  - Orion (satellite) – Class of United States spy satellites
  - Signals intelligence – Intelligence-gathering by interception of signals
- Space situational awareness satellites
  - Sapphire (satellite) – Canadian space surveillance satellite
  - Satellite collision – Collision involving one or more satellites in orbit
  - Sentient – U.S. government AI system
  - Space domain awareness – Surveillance from and of the outer space environment
  - U.S. Space Surveillance Network – SSA system

=== Navigation and timing ===
Animation of the Quasi-Zenith Satellite System's orbits around Earth.

Satellite navigation systems use signals from global navigation satellite systems and regional navigation systems to support geopositioning, navigation, and precise timing. Applications include air navigation, automotive navigation, marine navigation, surveying, geodesy, precision agriculture, and satellite-based augmentation systems such as the European Geostationary Navigation Overlay Service and Wide Area Augmentation System, which improve satellite navigation accuracy, integrity, continuity, or availability, and timing accuracy with procedures like time and frequency transfer.

- Navigation applications
  - Navigation – Process of monitoring and controlling the movement of a craft or vehicle
    - Satellite navigation – Use of satellite signals for navigation or geo-spatial positioning
      - Air navigation – Navigation for aviation
        - Area navigation – Aircraft navigation method
        - European Geostationary Navigation Overlay Service – System that enhances the accuracy of GPS receivers
        - Instrument flight rules – Civil aviation regulations for flight on instruments
        - Wide Area Augmentation System – System that enhances the accuracy of GPS receivers
      - Automotive navigation system – Part of the automobile controls
      - Marine navigation – Process of steering a ship from a starting point to a destination
        - Automatic identification system – Tracking system using transceivers on ships
        - Electronic navigational chart – Digital Map
        - GNSS augmentation – Method of improving a navigation system
      - Turn-by-turn navigation – Feature of GPS navigation devices
- Global navigation satellite systems
  - BeiDou – Chinese global navigation satellite system
  - Galileo (satellite navigation system) – European global navigation satellite system
  - Global Positioning System – American satellite-based radio navigation service
  - GLONASS – Russian global navigation satellite system
  - Indian Regional Navigation Satellite System – Satellite navigation system
  - Quasi-Zenith Satellite System – Japanese regional navigation satellite system
- Positioning
  - Geodesy – Science of measuring the shape, orientation, and gravity of Earth
  - Geopositioning – Determination of the geographic position of an object
  - Real-time kinematic positioning – Satellite navigation technique used to enhance the precision of position data
  - Surveying – Science of determining the positions of points and the distances and angles between them
- Precision agriculture
  - Normalized difference vegetation index – Metric quantifying vegetation density
  - Precision agriculture – Farming management strategy
- Regional navigation satellite systems
  - Korea Positioning System – Planned South Korean navigational system
- Satellite-based augmentation systems
  - European Geostationary Navigation Overlay Service – System that enhances the accuracy of GPS receivers
  - GNSS augmentation – Method of improving a navigation system
  - GPS-aided GEO augmented navigation – Regional satellite navigation system
  - Michibiki Satellite-based Augmentation Service – Japanese satellite based augmentation system
  - Wide Area Augmentation System – System that enhances the accuracy of GPS receivers
- Timing applications
  - Precise Time and Time Interval – Standard for highly accurate timing information
  - Time and frequency transfer – Scheme where multiple sites share a precise reference time or frequency

=== Weather and climate ===
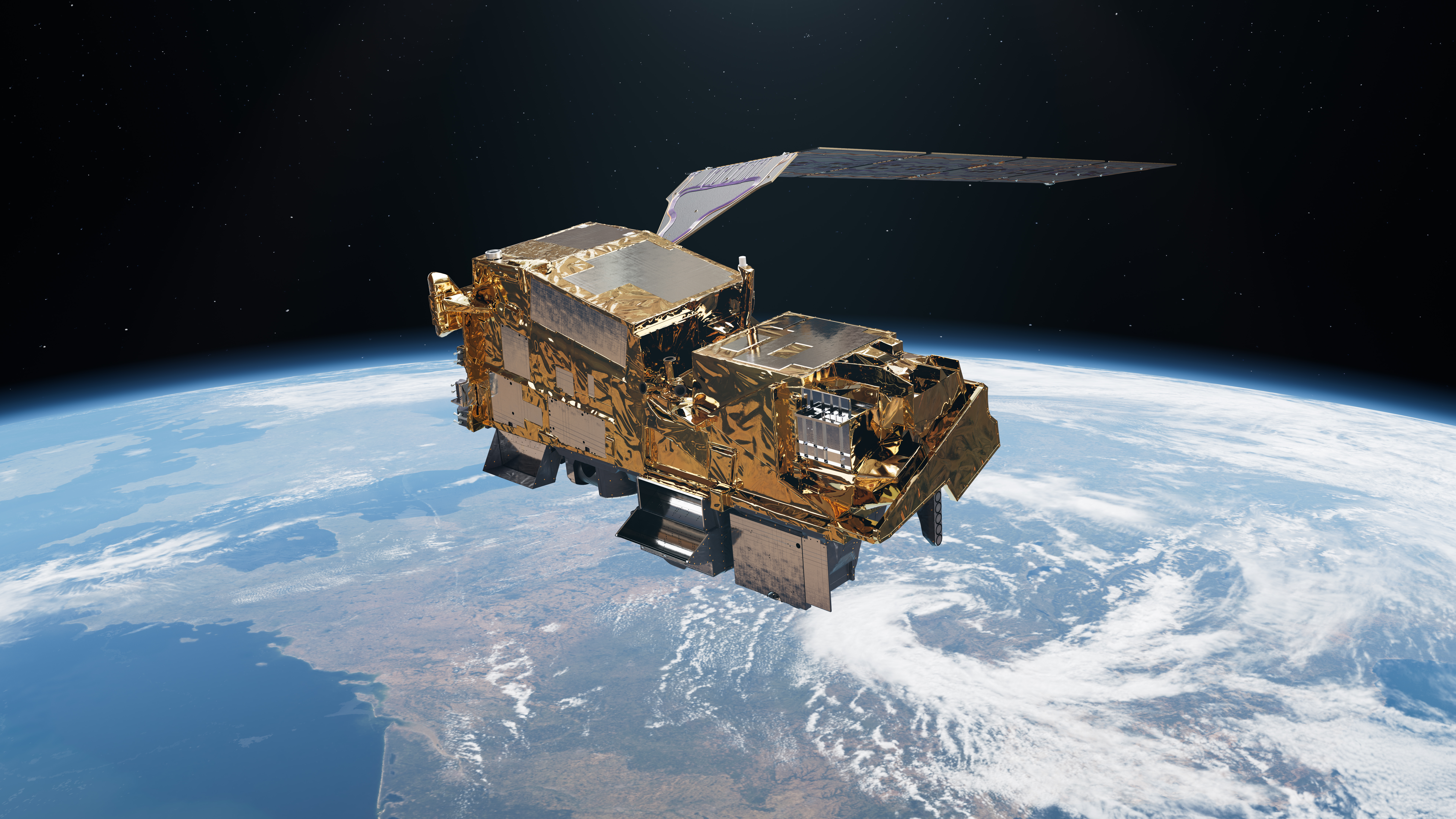
MetOp series meteorological satellite.

Weather satellites and meteorological satellite systems observe the atmosphere, clouds, precipitation, greenhouse gases, and other Earth-system variables used in weather forecasting and climate monitoring. Major uses include atmospheric sounding, cloud and storm monitoring, greenhouse gas monitoring, precipitation measurement, and long-term environmental observation by systems such as GOES, Meteosat, Himawari, and MetOp.

- Atmospheric sounding
  - Advanced microwave sounding unit – Instrument installed on meteorological satellites
  - Advanced Technology Microwave Sounder
  - Atmospheric sounding – Measurement of vertical distribution of physical properties of the atmospheric column
  - Infrared atmospheric sounding interferometer
- Cloud monitoring
  - Clouds and the Earth's Radiant Energy System – NASA satellite climate data instruments
  - CloudSat – NASA Earth observation satellite
  - Dvorak technique – Subjective technique to estimate tropical cyclone intensity
  - Global Precipitation Measurement – Joint mission between JAXA and NASA
- Greenhouse gas monitoring
  - Copernicus Climate Change Service – European Union scientific programme
  - Greenhouse Gases Observing Satellite – Japanese Earth observation satellite
  - Orbiting Carbon Observatory – Failed NASA climate satellite
  - Orbiting Carbon Observatory 2 – NASA climate satellite
  - Sentinel-5 Precursor – European Earth observation satellite
- Meteorological satellites
  - Advanced Very-High-Resolution Radiometer – Space-borne earth reflectance sensor
  - Deep Space Climate Observatory – American solar research spacecraft
  - Geostationary Operational Environmental Satellite – US weather satellite series
  - Himawari (satellites) – Geostationary meteorological satellite
  - Meteosat – Series of european weather satellites
  - MetOp – Series of European meteorological satellites
  - Weather satellite – Type of satellite designed to record the state of the Earth's atmosphere
- Storm tracking
  - Tropical Rainfall Measuring Mission – Joint space mission between NASA and JAXA

== Law, policy, and governance ==
=== Registration and responsibility ===
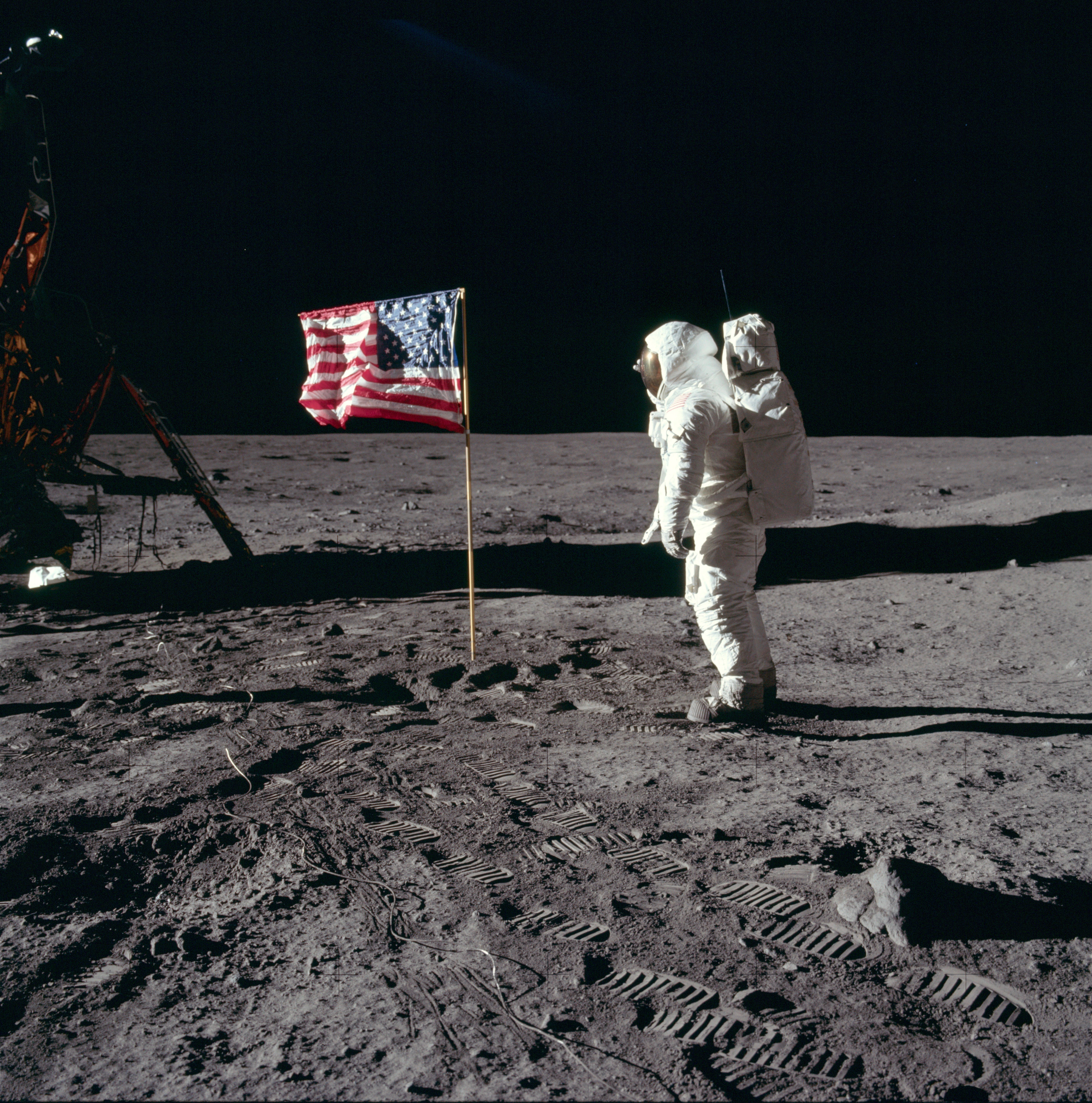
The deploying of the U.S. flag during the first crewed Moon landing (Apollo 11) on the lunar surface does not constitute a territorial claim, unlike historically practiced on Earth, since the US reinforced the Outer Space Treaty by adhering to it and making no such territorial claim.

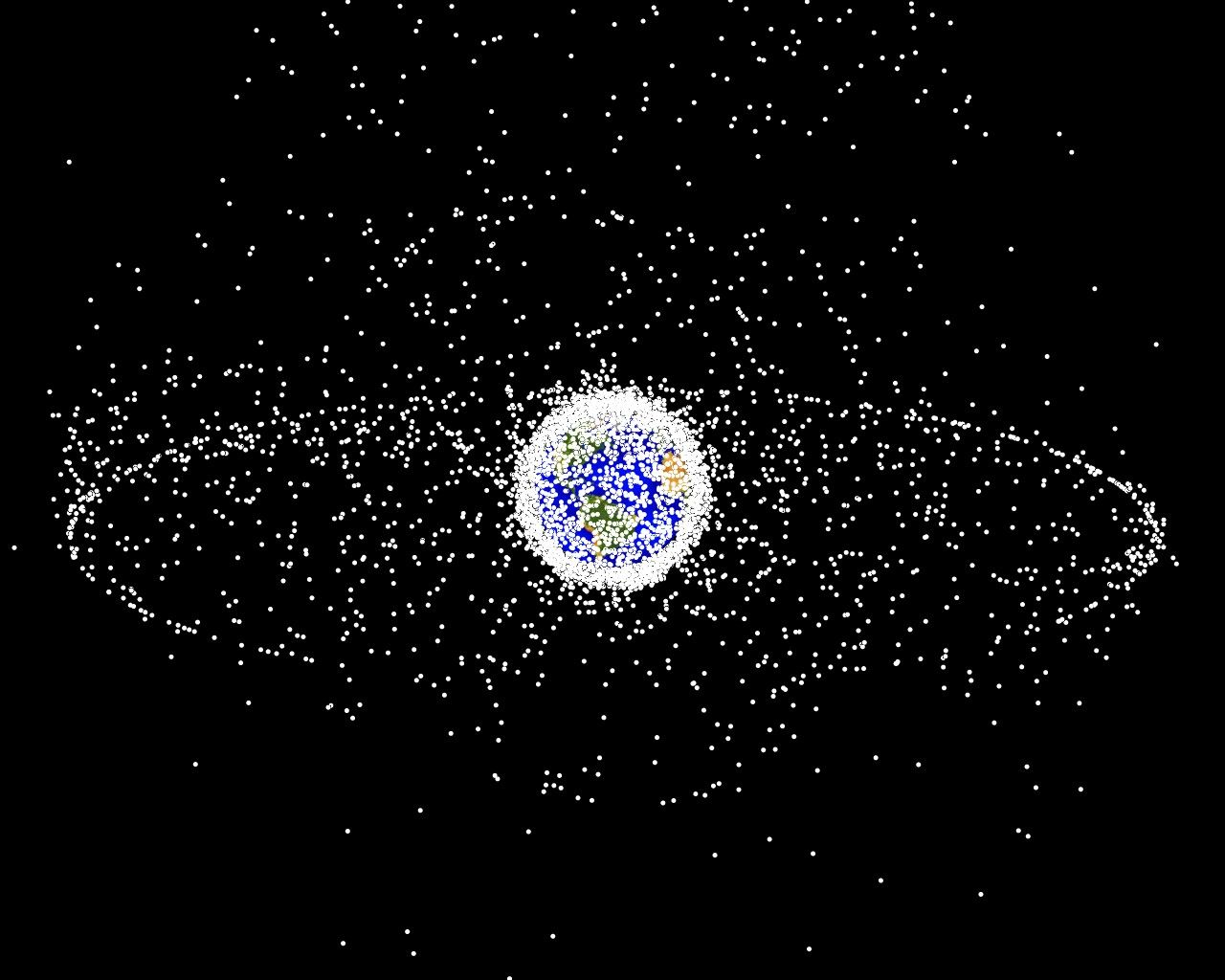
Space debris populations related to Kessler syndrome risks (not to scale) seen from outside geosynchronous orbit (GSO). There are two primary debris fields: the ring of objects in GSO and the cloud of objects in low Earth orbit (LEO).

Space law links satellites and other space objects to the states and agencies responsible for their launch, operation, registration, identification, and regulation. Under the Outer Space Treaty, states retain jurisdiction and control over registered space objects, bear international responsibility for national space activities, and may be liable for damage caused by their space objects. Related systems include launch, communications, and remote-sensing licensing; registration under the Registration Convention and the United Nations Register; and object identification through International Designators, Satellite Catalog Numbers, orbital elements, and two-line element sets.

- Jurisdiction and control
  - Commercial Space Launch Act of 1984 – Federal law facilitating commercialization of space technology
  - Commercial Space Launch Competitiveness Act of 2015 – Allows US industries to exploit space resources
  - Federal Aviation Administration – U.S. government agency regulating civil aviation
  - Federal Communications Commission – U.S. government agency
  - International law – Norms in international relations
  - Jurisdiction – Authority granted to a legal body or political leader to deal with legal matters
  - National Oceanic and Atmospheric Administration – US government scientific agency
  - Office of Commercial Space Transportation – Branch of the US FAA
  - Outer Space Treaty – Basis of international space law
  - Space jurisdiction – Aspect of what countries can enforce in space
  - Space law – Area of national and international law governing activities in outer space
  - Space policy – Public policy concerning the exploration of outer space
- Launching state
  - Launch vehicle – Rocket used to carry a spacecraft into space
  - Outer Space Treaty – Basis of international space law
  - Registration Convention – 1974 United Nations treaty
  - Space launch – Earliest phase of a flight that reaches space
  - Space Liability Convention – 1972 treaty that expands on the liability rules in the Outer Space Treaty
  - Spaceport – Location used to launch and receive spacecraft
  - State responsibility – Responsibility of government in international law
  - United Nations Committee on the Peaceful Uses of Outer Space – United Nations committee
  - United Nations Office for Outer Space Affairs – Space agency
- Liability for damage
  - 2009 satellite collision – First hypervelocity spacecraft collision
  - Iridium 33 – Communications satellite operated by Iridium Communications
  - Kessler syndrome – Theoretical satellite collision cascade
  - Kosmos 954 – Reconnaissance satellite of Soviet Union
  - Kosmos 2251 – Defunct Russian military communications satellite, operational from 1993 to 1995
  - Satellite collision – Collision involving one or more satellites in orbit
  - Space Liability Convention – 1972 treaty that expands on the liability rules in the Outer Space Treaty
- Satellite registration
  - International Designator – Alphanumerical designation for spacecraft
  - NASA Space Science Data Coordinated Archive – Archive of NASA data
  - Registration Convention – 1974 United Nations treaty
  - Satellite Catalog Number – NORAD satellite identifier
  - United Nations Office for Outer Space Affairs – Space agency
- Space object identification
  - NORAD – Bi-national military alliance
  - Orbital elements – Parameters that define a specific orbit
  - Satellite Catalog Number – NORAD satellite identifier
  - Space domain awareness – Surveillance from and of the outer space environment
  - Two-line element set – Orbital data format
  - U.S. Space Surveillance Network – SSA system

=== Space law ===
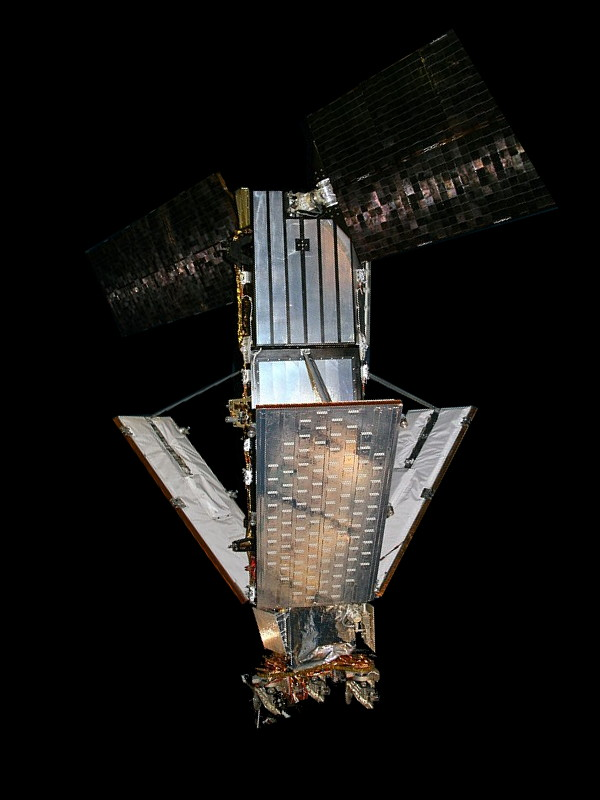
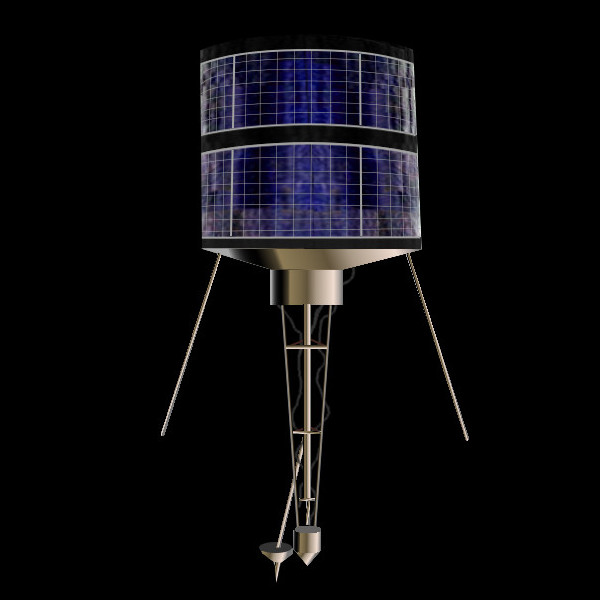
The 2009 satellite collision involved the craft Iridium 33 (silver and gold) and Kosmos 2251 (blue cylinder; digital render).

Space law is the national and international legal framework governing space activities, including liability for damage caused by space objects, registration of launched objects, national licensing of space activities, and treaty rules on exploration, non-appropriation, rescue, weapons, and use of the Moon and other celestial bodies. It includes the Outer Space Treaty, Space Liability Convention, Registration Convention, Moon Treaty, and national laws governing commercial and private spaceflight.

- Space law – Area of national and international law governing activities in outer space
- Liability Convention
  - 2009 satellite collision – First hypervelocity spacecraft collision
  - Kosmos 954 – Reconnaissance satellite of Soviet Union
  - Space Liability Convention – 1972 treaty that expands on the liability rules in the Outer Space Treaty
- Moon Agreement
  - Artemis Accords – Multilateral agreement on human moon exploration
  - Asteroid mining – Exploitation of raw materials from asteroids
  - Common heritage of humanity – Principle of international law
  - Extraterrestrial real estate – Ownership claims of property on other planets, moons, or parts of outer space
  - In situ resource utilization – Astronautical use of materials harvested in outer space
  - Lunar resources – In situ resources on the Moon
  - Moon Treaty – 1979 international treaty on celestial bodies
- National space law
  - Commercial Space Launch Act of 1984 – Federal law facilitating commercialization of space technology
  - Commercial Space Launch Competitiveness Act of 2015 – Allows US industries to exploit space resources
  - Federal Aviation Administration – U.S. government agency regulating civil aviation
  - Federal Communications Commission – U.S. government agency
  - National Aeronautics and Space Act – 1958 U.S. law creating NASA
  - National Oceanic and Atmospheric Administration – US government scientific agency
  - Office of Commercial Space Transportation – Branch of the US FAA
  - Outer Space Act 1986 – Act of the Parliament of the United Kingdom
  - Private spaceflight – Spaceflight not by a government
  - Space Industry Act 2018 – Act of the Parliament of the United Kingdom
  - Space policy – Public policy concerning the exploration of outer space
- Outer Space Treaty
  - Agreement on the Rescue of Astronauts, the Return of Astronauts, and the Return of Objects Launched into Outer Space – 1967 treaty on rescuing persons in space
  - Militarisation of space – Use of outer space for military aims
  - Outer Space Treaty – Basis of international space law
  - Space jurisdiction – Aspect of what countries can enforce in space
  - Space weapon – Weapons used in space warfare
  - United Nations Committee on the Peaceful Uses of Outer Space – United Nations committee
  - United Nations Office for Outer Space Affairs – Space agency
- Registration Convention
  - International Designator – Alphanumerical designation for spacecraft
  - Registration Convention – 1974 United Nations treaty
  - Satellite Catalog Number – NORAD satellite identifier

=== Space traffic management ===
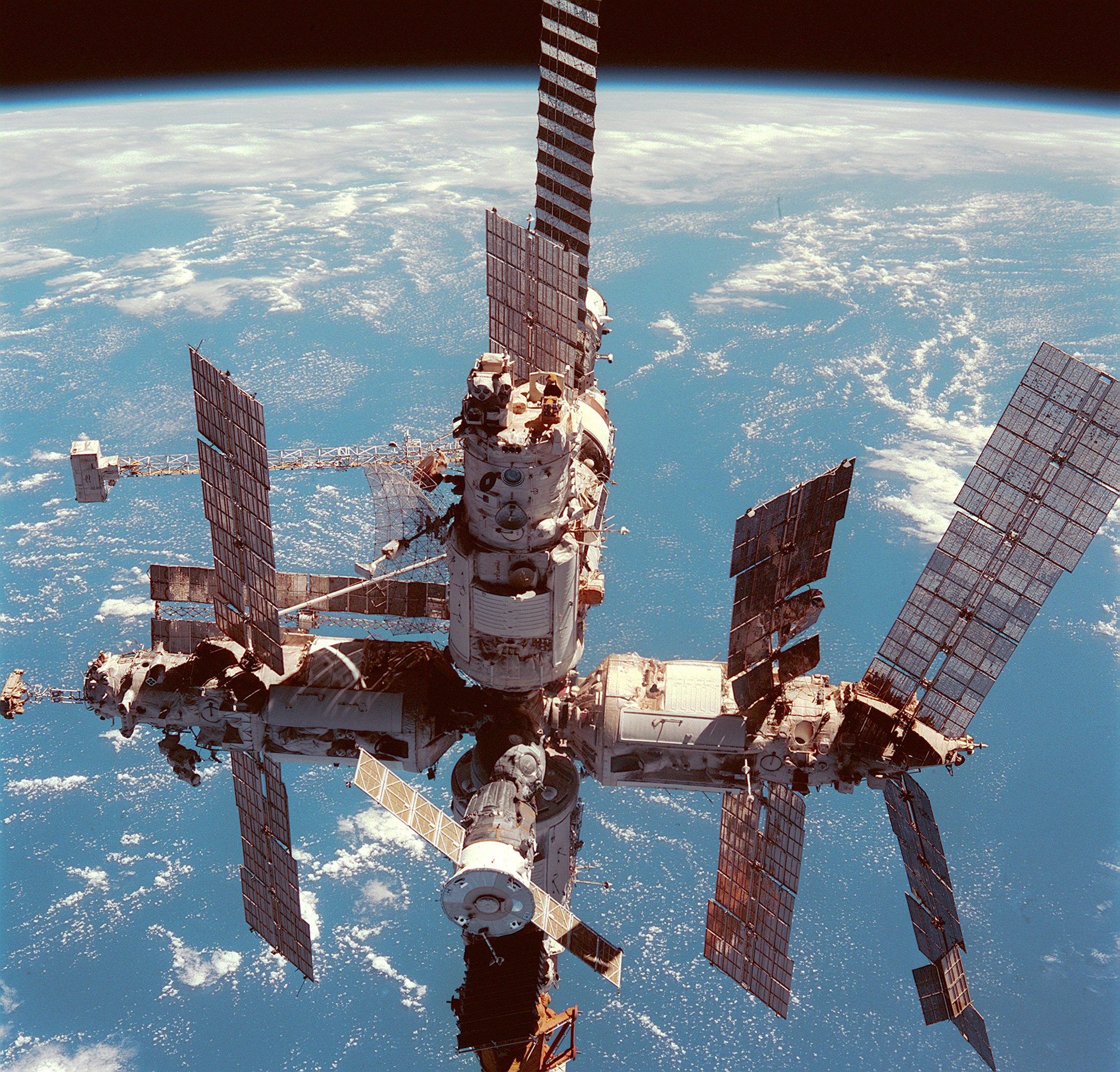
Mir in 1998, three years before it was deorbited.

Space traffic management covers the rules, data, and operating practices used to reduce collision, debris, reentry, and interference risks as satellites share increasingly crowded orbits. It includes commercial launch and reentry regulation, space situational awareness, collision avoidance, conjunction warnings, orbital-debris mitigation, end-of-life disposal, remote-sensing regulation, and tracking systems used to identify and monitor objects in orbit.

- Commercial space regulation
  - Commercial Space Launch Act – Federal law facilitating commercialization of space technology
  - Federal Aviation Administration – U.S. government agency regulating civil aviation
  - Office of Space Commerce – Office within the NOAA
- Conjunction warnings
  - 2009 satellite collision – First hypervelocity spacecraft collision
  - Collision avoidance (spacecraft) – Form of collision management in aeronautics
  - Iridium 33 – Communications satellite operated by Iridium Communications
  - Satellite collision – Collision involving one or more satellites in orbit
- End-of-life rules
  - Deorbit of Mir – Controlled atmospheric entry of Mir over the Pacific
  - Graveyard orbit – Spacecraft end-of-life orbit
  - List of space debris producing events
- Orbital debris guidelines
  - Kessler syndrome – Theoretical satellite collision cascade
  - List of reentering space debris
  - List of space debris producing events
  - RemoveDEBRIS – Project to demonstrate various space debris removal technologies
  - Space debris – Pollution around Earth by defunct artificial objects
- Remote sensing regulation
  - Remote sensing – Obtaining information through non-contact sensors
  - United Nations Committee on the Peaceful Uses of Outer Space – United Nations committee
- Space situational awareness governance
  - Geosynchronous Space Situational Awareness Program – American military space surveillance program
  - Space Based Space Surveillance – American military space surveillance program
  - Space situational awareness – Surveillance from and of the outer space environment
  - U.S. Space Surveillance Network – SSA system

=== Spectrum and orbital slots ===
Two geostationary satellites in the same orbit.

Spectrum management and orbital-slot coordination govern how satellites use radio frequencies and positions in orbit without causing harmful interference. For satellite networks, this includes International Telecommunication Union coordination, Radio Regulations, frequency allocation, geostationary orbital slots, harmful-interference rules, and shared use of bands such as C band, Ku band, and Ka band.

- Coordination of satellite networks
  - International Telecommunication Union – Specialized agency of the United Nations
  - Radio Regulations – Regulation and licensing of radio waves in law
  - Satellite coordination
- Geostationary orbital slots
  - Clarke Belt – Circular orbit above Earth's Equator and following the direction of Earth's rotation
  - Geostationary orbit – Circular orbit above Earth's Equator and following the direction of Earth's rotation
  - Satellite arc – Imaginary Arc in the Sky
  - Orbital slot – Circular orbit above Earth's Equator and following the direction of Earth's rotation
  - Spectrum management – Regulating the use of radio frequencies to promote efficient use
- Harmful interference
  - Electromagnetic interference – Disturbance in an electrical circuit due to external sources of radio waves
  - Harmful interference – Disturbance in an electrical circuit due to external sources of radio waves
  - Radio jamming – Interference with authorized wireless communications
  - Radio Regulations – Regulation and licensing of radio waves in law
- International Telecommunication Union
  - International Telecommunication Union – Specialized agency of the United Nations
  - ITU Radiocommunication Sector – One of the three sectors of the ITU
  - Radio Regulations – Regulation and licensing of radio waves in law
  - World Radiocommunication Conference – Convention
- Orbital slot assignment
  - First-come, first-served – Mathematical study of waiting lines, or queues
  - Bringing into use – Treaty
  - Orbital slot – Circular orbit above Earth's Equator and following the direction of Earth's rotation
  - Paper satellite
- Radiofrequency allocation
  - C band – Range of radio frequencies from 4 to 8 GHz
  - Frequency allocation – Allocation and regulation of the electromagnetic spectrum into radio frequency bands
  - ITU Radio Regulations – Treaty
  - Ka band – Portion of the microwave part of the electromagnetic spectrum (26.5–40 gigahertz)
  - Ku band – Range of radio frequencies from 11–20 GHz
  - Radio spectrum – Electromagnetic spectrum, 3 Hz – 3000 GHz
  - Spectrum management – Regulating the use of radio frequencies to promote efficient use

== Orbits ==
Satellite orbits are chosen to match a mission's coverage, altitude, viewing geometry, communications needs, lifetime, and propulsion limits. They range from near-Earth paths used by communications, navigation, weather, reconnaissance, and Earth observation satellites to lunar, planetary, small-body, heliocentric, and Lagrange-region trajectories used in space science and exploration.

=== Earth orbits ===
Illustration of various satellite Earth orbital spaceflight altitudes.

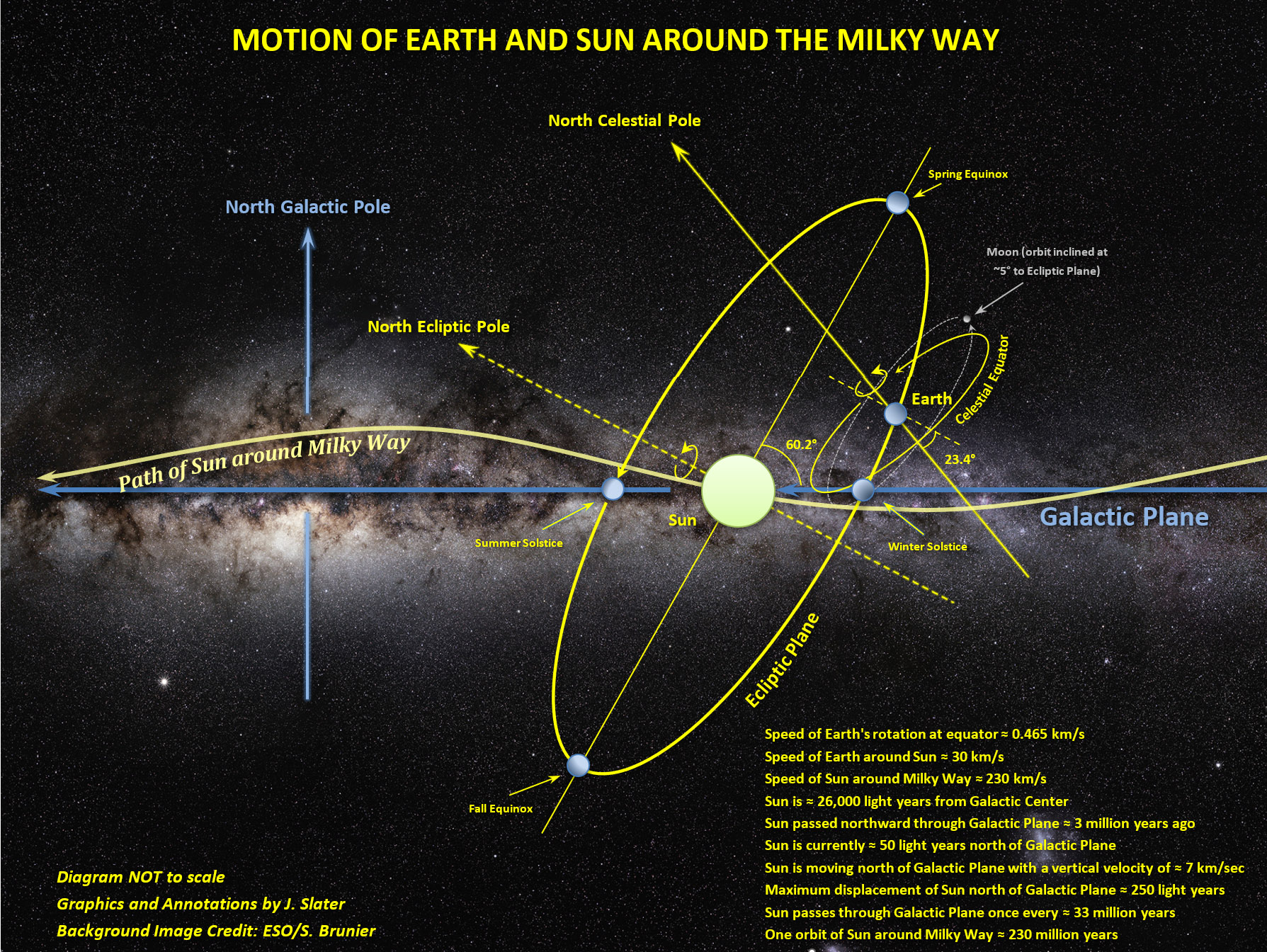
Celestial equator in relation to the galactic and ecliptic planes.

Video of Orion's skip reentry on Artemis 1, showing the entire reentry process unedited from space to splashdown.

Retrograde orbit: the satellite (red) orbits in the direction opposite to the rotation of its primary (blue/black).

Galileo visibility from locations on Earth's surface in orbital motion.

Diagram showing the orientation of a Sun-synchronous orbit (green) at four points in the year. A non-Sun-synchronous orbit (magenta) is also shown for reference. Dates are shown in white: day/month.

Earth-orbiting satellites use altitude, inclination, eccentricity, and ground-track design to balance coverage, revisit time, resolution, lifetime, radiation exposure, and access to ground stations. Common operational orbit families include low, medium, geosynchronous, geostationary, polar, Sun-synchronous, highly elliptical, and transfer orbits. GEO spacecraft may also be moved into disposal or graveyard orbits at the end of their missions.

- Equatorial orbit
  - Celestial equator – Projection of Earth's equator out into space
  - Equator – Imaginary line halfway between Earth's North and South poles
  - Geocentric orbit – Orbit around Earth
  - Geostationary orbit – Circular orbit above Earth's Equator and following the direction of Earth's rotation
  - Geosynchronous orbit – Orbit keeping the satellite at a fixed longitude above the equator
  - Near-equatorial orbit – Type of orbit around an astronomical body
  - Orbital inclination – Angle between a reference plane and the plane of an orbit
- Geostationary orbit
  - Clarke Belt – Circular orbit above Earth's Equator and following the direction of Earth's rotation
  - Communications satellite – Artificial satellite that relays radio signals
  - Geostationary Operational Environmental Satellite – US weather satellite series
  - Geostationary orbit – Circular orbit above Earth's Equator and following the direction of Earth's rotation
  - Geosynchronous orbit – Orbit keeping the satellite at a fixed longitude above the equator
  - Himawari (satellites) – Geostationary meteorological satellite
  - List of satellites in geostationary orbit
  - Meteosat – Series of european weather satellites
  - Orbital slot – Circular orbit above Earth's Equator and following the direction of Earth's rotation
  - Orbital station-keeping – Maintenance of a particular orbit
  - Satellite television – Broadcasting of television using artificial satellites
  - Weather satellite – Type of satellite designed to record the state of the Earth's atmosphere
- Geosynchronous orbit
  - Geostationary orbit – Circular orbit above Earth's Equator and following the direction of Earth's rotation
  - Geosynchronous orbit – Orbit keeping the satellite at a fixed longitude above the equator
  - Inclined geosynchronous orbit – Orbit keeping the satellite at a fixed longitude above the equator
  - Inclined orbit – Orbital plane that is tipped away from the equator
  - List of satellites in geosynchronous orbit
  - Quasi-Zenith Satellite System – Japanese regional navigation satellite system
  - Synchronous orbit – Orbit of an astronomical body equal to that body's average rotational period
  - Tundra orbit – Highly elliptical and highly inclined synchronous orbit
- Graveyard orbit
  - Atmospheric entry – Passage of an object through the gases of an atmosphere from outer space
  - Disposal orbit – Spacecraft end-of-life orbit
  - Graveyard orbit – Spacecraft end-of-life orbit
  - Inter-Agency Space Debris Coordination Committee – Inter-governmental forum
  - Orbital decay – Process that leads to gradual decrease of the distance between two orbiting bodies
  - Passivation (spacecraft) – Removal of internal energy in a spaceship at end of its mission
  - Space debris – Pollution around Earth by defunct artificial objects
- Highly elliptical orbit
  - Apsis – Either of two extreme points in a celestial object's orbit
  - Argument of periapsis – Specifies the orbit of an object in space
  - Elliptic orbit – Kepler orbit with an eccentricity of less than one
  - Highly elliptical orbit – Orbit in the two body case with high eccentricity
  - Molniya (satellite) – Soviet military surveillance and communications satellites
  - Molniya orbit – Type of high-latitude satellite orbit
  - Orbital eccentricity – Amount by which an orbit deviates from a perfect circle
  - Tundra orbit – Highly elliptical and highly inclined synchronous orbit
  - Van Allen radiation belt – Zone of energetic charged particles around the planet Earth
- Inclined orbit
  - Geosynchronous orbit – Orbit keeping the satellite at a fixed longitude above the equator
  - Inclined geosynchronous orbit – Orbit keeping the satellite at a fixed longitude above the equator
  - Inclined orbit – Orbital plane that is tipped away from the equator
  - Orbital inclination – Angle between a reference plane and the plane of an orbit
  - Polar orbit – Satellite orbit with high inclination
  - Retrograde and prograde motion – Relative directions of orbit or rotation
  - Sun-synchronous orbit – Type of geocentric orbit
- Low Earth orbit
  - Eutelsat OneWeb – Global communications company
  - HawkEye 360 – American radio signal analytics company
  - Hubble Space Telescope – NASA/ESA space telescope launched in 1990
  - International Space Station – Modular space station in low Earth orbit
  - Iridium satellite constellation – Satellite constellation providing voice and data coverage
  - Landsat program – American network of Earth-observing satellites for international research purposes
  - Low Earth orbit – Orbit around Earth between 160 and 2000 km
  - Orbcomm – American wireless networking and telecommunications company
  - Planet Labs – American space technology company
  - Sentinel-1 – Earth observation satellite
  - Sentinel-2 – Earth observation mission
  - Starlink – SpaceX satellite Internet constellation
  - Swarm Technologies – US telecommunications company
  - Tiangong space station – Chinese modular space station (since 2021)
- Medium Earth orbit
  - BeiDou – Chinese global navigation satellite system
  - Galileo (satellite navigation system) – European global navigation satellite system
  - Global Positioning System – American satellite-based radio navigation service
  - GLONASS – Russian global navigation satellite system
  - GPS satellite blocks – Generations of US navigation satellites
  - Medium Earth orbit – Earth-centered orbit above low Earth orbit and below geostationary orbit
  - Navigation satellite – Use of satellite signals for navigation or geo-spatial positioning
  - O3b – Group of telecommunications satellites
  - Van Allen radiation belt – Zone of energetic charged particles around the planet Earth
- Molniya orbit
  - Apsis – Either of two extreme points in a celestial object's orbit
  - Argument of periapsis – Specifies the orbit of an object in space
  - Highly elliptical orbit – Orbit in the two body case with high eccentricity
  - Molniya (satellite) – Soviet military surveillance and communications satellites
  - Molniya orbit – Type of high-latitude satellite orbit
  - Orbital eccentricity – Amount by which an orbit deviates from a perfect circle
  - Orbital inclination – Angle between a reference plane and the plane of an orbit
  - Tundra orbit – Highly elliptical and highly inclined synchronous orbit
- Polar orbit
  - Defense Meteorological Satellite Program – United States Department of Defense weather monitoring program
  - GRACE and GRACE-FO – Joint American-German space mission to map Earth's gravitational field
  - ICESat-2 – NASA Earth observation satellite
  - Landsat program – American network of Earth-observing satellites for international research purposes
  - List of NOAA satellites
  - MetOp – Series of European meteorological satellites
  - Polar orbit – Satellite orbit with high inclination
  - Radarsat-1 – Canadian Earth observation satellite (1995–2013)
  - Radarsat-2 – Canadian earth observation satellite
  - Reconnaissance satellite – Satellite that covertly collects data for intelligence or military applications
  - Sentinel-1 – Earth observation satellite
  - Sentinel-2 – Earth observation mission
  - Sun-synchronous orbit – Type of geocentric orbit
  - Weather satellite – Type of satellite designed to record the state of the Earth's atmosphere
- Sun-synchronous orbit
  - A-train (satellite constellation) – Satellite constellation of three Earth observation satellites
  - Aqua (satellite) – NASA scientific research satellite (2002–present)
  - Cartosat – Indian Earth observation satellite series
  - Landsat 8 – American earth observation satellite
  - Landsat 9 – American earth observation satellite
  - Landsat program – American network of Earth-observing satellites for international research purposes
  - Polar orbit – Satellite orbit with high inclination
  - Resourcesat-2 – Indian earth observation satellite
  - Sentinel-1 – Earth observation satellite
  - Sentinel-2 – Earth observation mission
  - SPOT (satellite) – Commercial Earth-imaging satellite system operated by the French space agency CNES
  - Sun-synchronous orbit – Type of geocentric orbit
  - Suomi NPP – American Earth weather satellite (2011–present)
  - Terra (satellite) – NASA climate research satellite (1999–present)
- Tundra orbit
  - Argument of periapsis – Specifies the orbit of an object in space
  - Digital audio radio service – US classification for digital radio services
  - Geosynchronous orbit – Orbit keeping the satellite at a fixed longitude above the equator
  - Highly elliptical orbit – Orbit in the two body case with high eccentricity
  - Molniya orbit – Type of high-latitude satellite orbit
  - Orbital eccentricity – Amount by which an orbit deviates from a perfect circle
  - Orbital inclination – Angle between a reference plane and the plane of an orbit
  - Quasi-Zenith Satellite System – Japanese regional navigation satellite system
  - SiriusXM – American radio broadcasting corporation
  - Tundra orbit – Highly elliptical and highly inclined synchronous orbit
- Very low Earth orbit
  - Drag (physics) – Retarding force on a body moving in a fluid
  - GOCE – ESA satellite to map Earth's gravity field
  - Low Earth orbit – Orbit around Earth between 160 and 2000 km
  - Orbital decay – Process that leads to gradual decrease of the distance between two orbiting bodies
  - Super Low Altitude Test Satellite – Japanese satellite
  - Very low Earth orbit – Range of low orbital altitudes
  - Zero-drag satellite – Satellites where the payload follows a geodesic path through space

=== Lagrange-point orbits ===
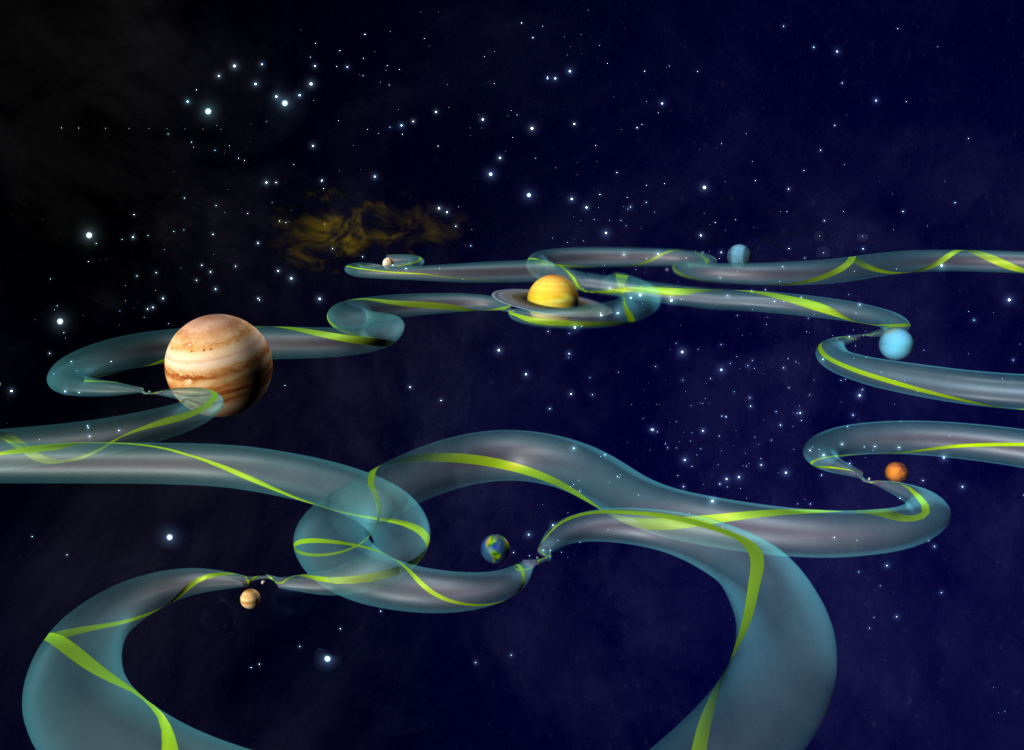
Stylized depiction of the Interplanetary Transport Network path through the Solar System. The green ribbon represents one path of mathematically possibles options along the darker green bounding tube. Abrupt ribbon changes represent trajectory changes at Lagrange points. Constricted areas represent locations where objects linger in temporary orbit around a point before continuing on.

Lagrange point orbits use the gravitational structure of the three-body problem to keep spacecraft near useful equilibrium regions with limited station-keeping. They include halo orbits, Lissajous orbits, distant retrograde orbits, and other cislunar or interplanetary trajectories used for Earth-Sun observatories, Earth-Moon relay and Gateway missions, and low-energy transfer paths associated with the Interplanetary Transport Network.

- Interplanetary Transport Network – Low-energy trajectories in the Solar System
- Lagrange point – Equilibrium points near two orbiting bodies
- Three-body problem – Physics problem related to laws of motion and gravity
- Distant retrograde orbits
  - Distant retrograde orbit – Type of spacecraft orbit
- Earth-Moon Lagrange-point orbits
  - Artemis program – NASA-led lunar exploration program
  - CAPSTONE – NASA satellite to test the Lunar Gateway orbit
  - Distant retrograde orbit – Type of spacecraft orbit
  - Lunar Gateway – Cancelled lunar orbital space station
  - Queqiao-1 – Chinese lunar communications satellite
- Earth-Sun Lagrange-point orbits
  - Advanced Composition Explorer – NASA satellite of the Explorer program, at SE-L1 from 1997
  - Deep Space Climate Observatory – American solar research spacecraft
  - Gaia (spacecraft) – European optical space observatory for astrometry
  - Herschel Space Observatory – ESA space telescope in service 2009–2013
  - James Webb Space Telescope – NASA/ESA/CSA space telescope launched in 2021
  - Planck (spacecraft) – Space observatory
  - Solar and Heliospheric Observatory – European space observatory
  - Wilkinson Microwave Anisotropy Probe – NASA satellite of the Explorer program
- Halo orbits
  - Halo orbit – Periodic, three-dimensional orbit
- Lissajous orbits
  - Lissajous orbit – Quasi-periodic orbital trajectory

=== Non-Earth orbits ===
The launch of Dawn as seen per the YouTube video released on 20 December 2010 NASA's Kennedy Space Center.

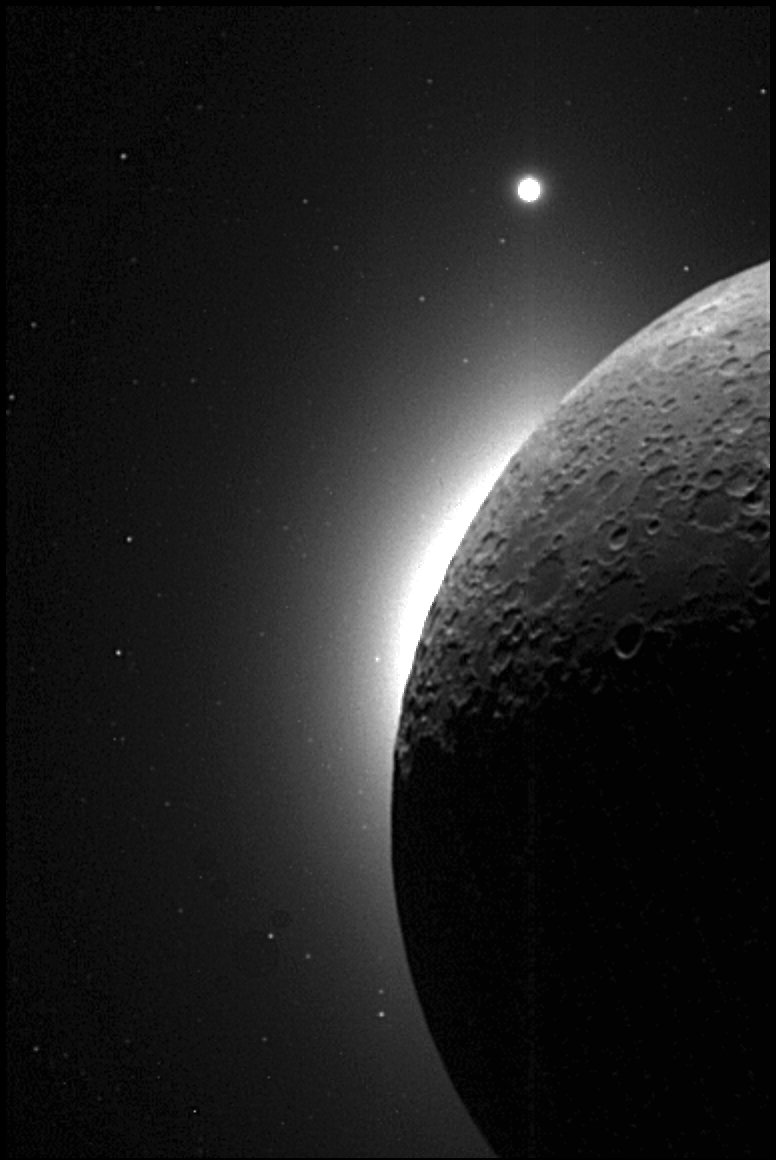
Clementine star tracker view of the Moon and Venus in the distance.

Artist's concept of Cassini's orbit insertion around Saturn.

Non-Earth orbits extend spacecraft operations beyond geocentric space, including lunar, planetary, small-body, dwarf-planet, cometary, and heliocentric trajectories. These missions use interplanetary navigation, trajectory correction, and orbital insertion to support planetary science, relay communications, surface reconnaissance, sample-return support, and small-body exploration.

- Dwarf-planet orbit
  - 4 Vesta – Second largest main-belt asteroid
  - Actaea (moon) – Moon of 120347 Salacia
  - Ceres (dwarf planet) – Dwarf planet in the asteroid belt
  - Charon (moon) – Largest natural satellite of Pluto
  - Dawn (spacecraft) – NASA orbiter mission to asteroid Vesta and dwarf planet Ceres (2007–2018)
  - Dwarf planet – Small planetary-mass object
  - Dysnomia (moon) – Moon of Eris
  - Hiʻiaka (moon) – Larger moon of Haumea
  - Hydra (moon) – Moon of Pluto
  - Kerberos (moon) – Small natural satellite of Pluto
  - List of natural satellites
  - Moons of Pluto – Natural satellites orbiting Pluto
  - Namaka (moon) – Smaller moon of Haumea
  - Nix (moon) – Moon of Pluto
  - Styx (moon) – Small natural satellite of Pluto
  - Vanth (moon) – Moon of Orcus
  - Weywot – Moon of dwarf planet Quaoar
  - Xiangliu (moon) – Moon of the dwarf planet Gonggong
- Heliocentric orbit
  - Dawn (spacecraft) – NASA orbiter mission to asteroid Vesta and dwarf planet Ceres (2007–2018)
  - Genesis (spacecraft) – NASA sample return probe
  - Heliocentric orbit – Orbit around the barycenter of the Sun
  - Helios (spacecraft) – NASA/DLR solar probes launched in 1974–76
  - Kepler space telescope – NASA space telescope for exoplanetology (2009–2018)
  - List of artificial objects in heliocentric orbit
  - New Horizons – NASA spacecraft (2006–present)
  - Parker Solar Probe – NASA probe of the Sun's outer corona
  - Solar Orbiter – European space-based solar observatory
  - Spitzer Space Telescope – NASA infrared space telescope (2003–2020)
  - STEREO – Solar observation mission (2006–present)
  - Ulysses (spacecraft) – NASA/ESA solar probe launched in 1990
- Lunar orbit
  - CAPSTONE – NASA satellite to test the Lunar Gateway orbit
  - Chandrayaan-1 – Indian lunar mission (2008–2009)
  - Chandrayaan-2 – Indian lunar mission (2019–Present)
  - Chang'e 1 – Chinese lunar orbiter (2007–2009)
  - Chang'e 2 – Chinese Moon orbiter
  - Chang'e 5 – Chinese lunar exploration mission
  - Chang'e 6 – Chinese lunar sample-return mission
  - Clementine (spacecraft) – American space project
  - GRAIL – NASA orbiter mission to the Moon (2011–2012)
  - LADEE – Former NASA Lunar mission
  - Lunar Gateway – Cancelled lunar orbital space station
  - Lunar orbit – Orbit of an object around the Moon
  - Lunar Orbiter program – Series of five uncrewed lunar orbiter missions
  - Lunar Prospector – Third mission of the Discovery program; polar orbital reconnaissance of the Moon
  - Lunar Reconnaissance Orbiter – NASA robotic spacecraft orbiting the moon
  - Queqiao-1 – Chinese lunar communications satellite
  - SMART-1 – European Space Agency satellite that orbited the Moon
- Mars orbit
  - 2001 Mars Odyssey – NASA orbiter for geology and hydrology
  - Areocentric orbit – Orbit around the planet Mars
  - Deimos (moon) – Smaller and outer moon of Mars
  - Emirates Mars Mission – Space exploration probe mission to Mars
  - Mariner 9 – First spacecraft to enter orbit around Mars (1971–1972)
  - Mars Climate Orbiter – Failed NASA mission to Mars (1998–1999)
  - Mars Express – European orbiter mission to Mars (2003–present)
  - Mars Global Surveyor – NASA orbiter mission to Mars (1996–2006)
  - Mars Orbiter Mission – Indian orbiter mission to Mars (2013–2022)
  - Mars Reconnaissance Orbiter – NASA spacecraft active since 2005
  - MAVEN – NASA Mars orbiter (2013–2025)
  - Orbit of Mars – Martian orbit around the Sun
  - Phobos (moon) – Larger of the two moons of Mars
  - Tianwen-1 – Interplanetary mission by China to place an orbiter, lander, and rover on Mars
  - Trace Gas Orbiter – Mars orbiter, part of ExoMars programme
  - Viking 1 – Robotic spacecraft sent to Mars
  - Viking 2 – Space orbiter and lander sent to Mars
- Planetary orbit
  - Akatsuki (spacecraft) – Japanese orbiter mission to Venus (2010–2024)
  - BepiColombo – ESA/JAXA mission to study Mercury in orbit (2018–present)
  - Cassini–Huygens – Mission to Saturn (1997–2017)
  - Chandrayaan-2 – Indian lunar mission (2019–Present)
  - Galileo (spacecraft) – First NASA mission to orbit Jupiter (1989–2003)
  - Juno (spacecraft) – Second NASA orbiter mission to Jupiter (2011–Present)
  - List of extraterrestrial orbiters
  - Lunar Reconnaissance Orbiter – NASA robotic spacecraft orbiting the moon
  - Mars Express – European orbiter mission to Mars (2003–present)
  - Mars Reconnaissance Orbiter – NASA spacecraft active since 2005
  - MAVEN – NASA Mars orbiter (2013–2025)
  - MESSENGER – NASA mission to Mercury
  - Orbit – Curved path of an object around a point
  - Planetary science – Science of planets and planetary systems
  - Venus Express – European orbiter mission to Venus (2005–2015)
- Small-body orbit
  - 4 Vesta – Second largest main-belt asteroid
  - 67P/Churyumov–Gerasimenko – Periodic contact binary comet
  - 433 Eros – Near-Earth asteroid
  - 25143 Itokawa – Potentially hazardous near-Earth asteroid in the Apollo group
  - 101955 Bennu – Carbonaceous Apollo asteroid
  - 162173 Ryugu – Apollo asteroid
  - Asteroid – Minor planet found within the inner Solar System
  - Ceres (dwarf planet) – Dwarf planet in the asteroid belt
  - Comet – Natural object in space that releases gas
  - Dawn (spacecraft) – NASA orbiter mission to asteroid Vesta and dwarf planet Ceres (2007–2018)
  - Hayabusa – Japanese probe to asteroid and sample return (2003–2010)
  - Hayabusa2 – Japanese space mission to asteroid Ryugu
  - Hera (space mission) – Planetary defence spacecraft developed by the ESA
  - NEAR Shoemaker – American space probe to asteroid (1996–2001)
  - OSIRIS-REx – NASA asteroid sample return mission (2016–2023)
  - Psyche (spacecraft) – Reconnaissance mission of the main belt asteroid 16 Psyche
  - Rosetta (spacecraft) – European mission to study Comet 67P/Churyumov-Gerasimenko (2004–2016)
  - Small Solar System body – Object in the Solar System
- Venus orbit
  - Akatsuki (spacecraft) – Japanese orbiter mission to Venus (2010–2024)
  - Magellan (spacecraft) – NASA orbiter mission to Venus (1989–1994)
  - Pioneer Venus Orbiter – NASA orbiter mission to Venus (1978–1992)
  - Vega 1 – Soviet mission to Venus and Halley's Comet (1984–1987)
  - Vega 2 – Soviet mission to Venus and Halley's Comet (1984–1987)
  - Venera 9 – 1975 Soviet uncrewed space mission to Venus
  - Venera 10 – Space probe
  - Venera 15 – 1983 uncrewed Soviet spacecraft to Venus
  - Venera 16 – 1983 uncrewed Soviet spacecraft to Venus
  - Venus Express – European orbiter mission to Venus (2005–2015)

=== Orbital parameters and maneuvers ===
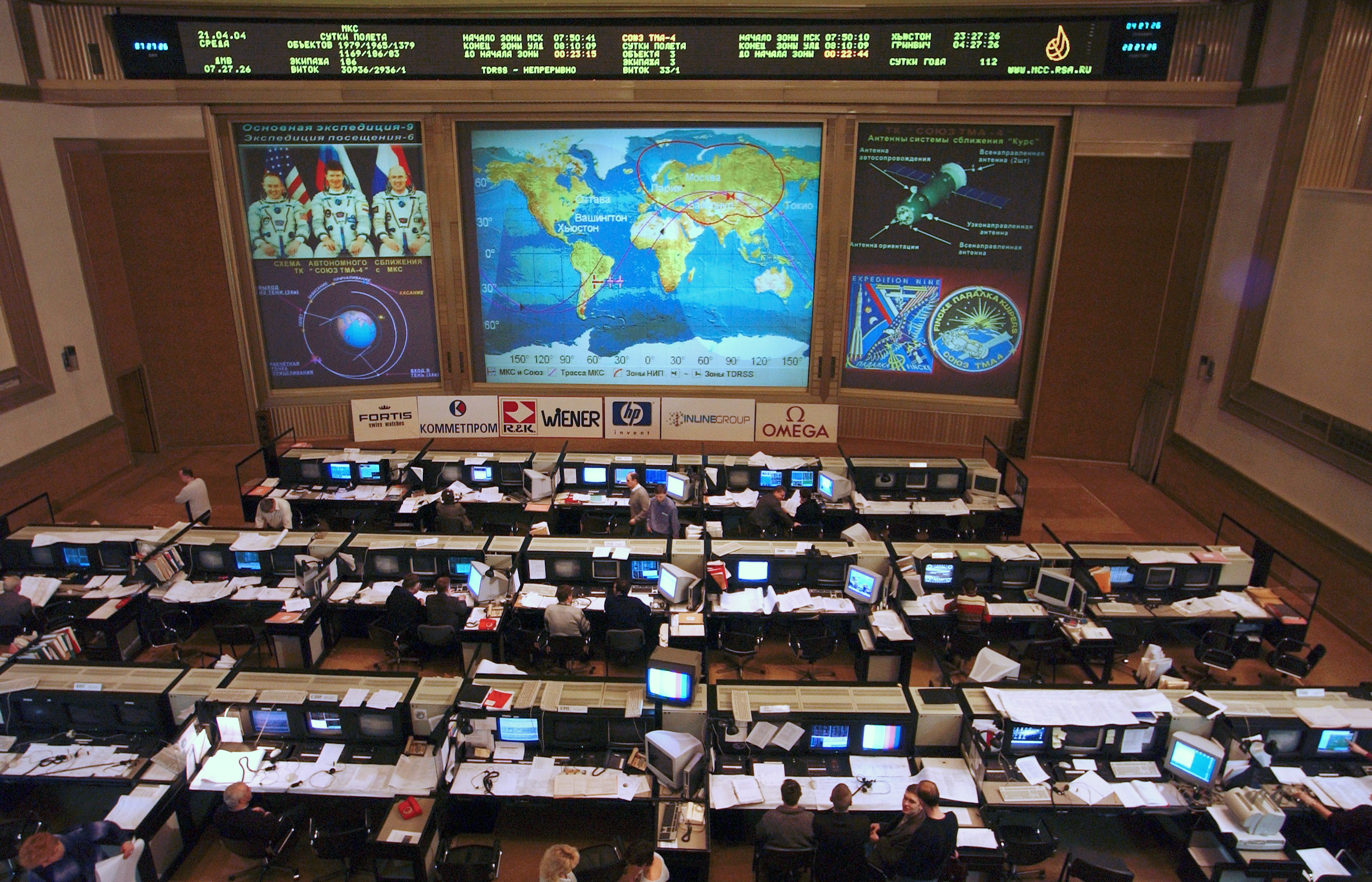
RKA Mission Control Center in Korolyov, Russia. The central monitor displays the ground track of the International Space Station.

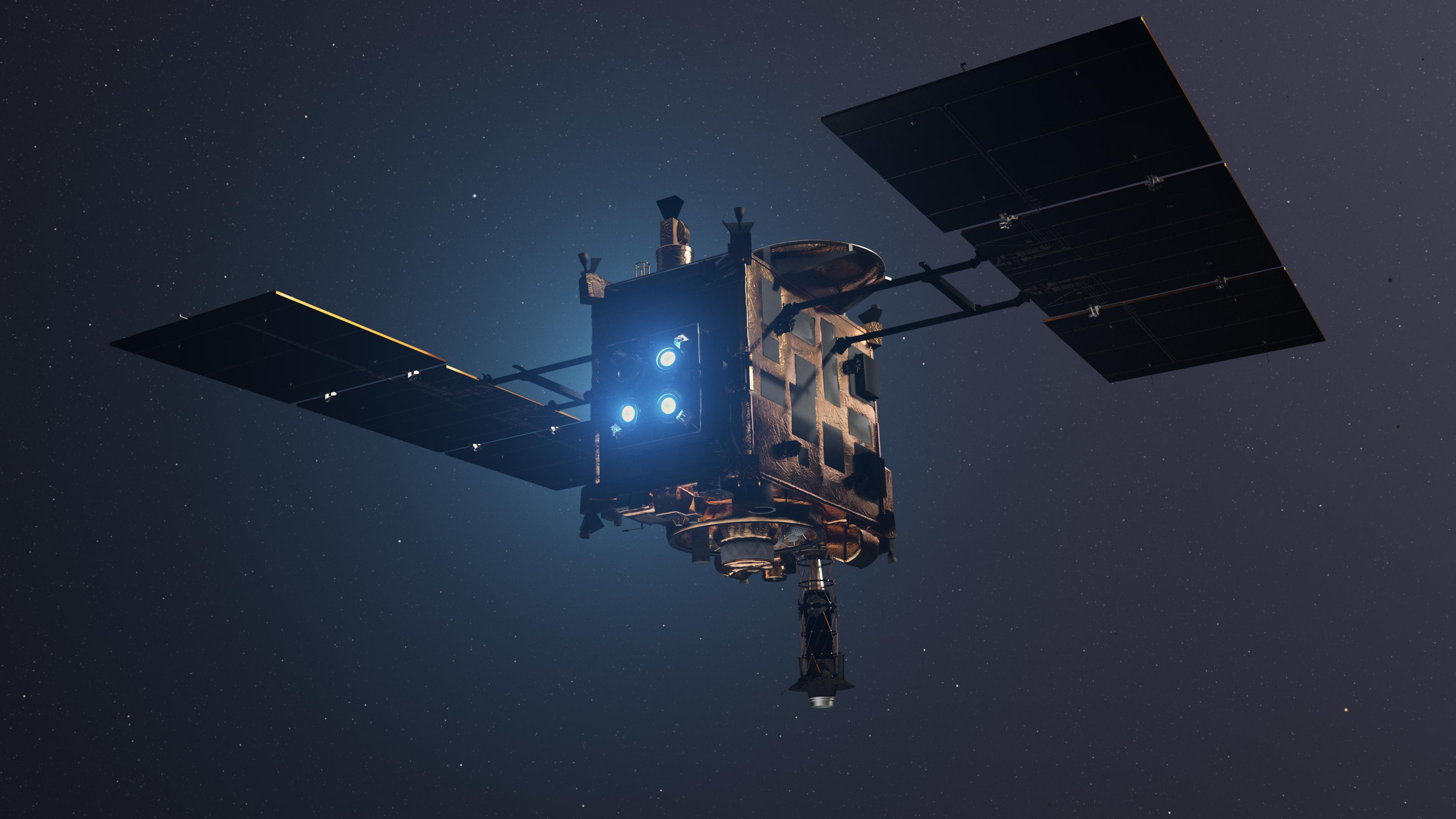
Rendering of Hayabusa 2's ion propulsion system in use.

Orbital parameters describe where a satellite is, how its orbit is shaped, and how that orbit changes over time. Maneuvers such as insertion, transfer, station-keeping, orbit raising and station-keeping use propulsive maneuvers to place satellites in useful orbits and maintain them there, while deorbiting and disposal use drag-augmentation devices, reentry planning, storage orbits, or other disposal strategies to remove spacecraft from operational regions.

- Orbital elements and parameters
  - Apsis – Either of two extreme points in a celestial object's orbit
  - Frozen orbit – Orbit in which natural drifting has been minimized
  - Ground track – Path on the surface of the Earth or another body directly below an aircraft or satellite
  - Orbital eccentricity – Amount by which an orbit deviates from a perfect circle
  - Orbital elements – Parameters that define a specific orbit
  - Orbital inclination – Angle between a reference plane and the plane of an orbit
  - Orbital mechanics – Field of classical mechanics concerned with the motion of spacecraft
  - Orbital node – Point where an orbit crosses a plane of reference to which it is inclined
  - Orbital period – Time an astronomical object takes to complete one orbit around another object
  - Orbital resonance – Regular and periodic mutual gravitational influence of orbiting bodies
  - Repeat ground track
  - Right ascension of the ascending node – Defining the orbit of an object in space
  - Two-line element set – Orbital data format
- Orbit insertion and transfer
  - Apogee kick motor – Rocket motor used to circularise a satellite's orbit after launch
  - Bi-elliptic transfer – Type of orbital maneuver
  - Delta-v – Measure of amount of effort to change trajectory
  - Electric orbit raising
  - Geostationary transfer orbit – Transfer orbit used to reach geosynchronous or geostationary orbit
  - Hohmann transfer orbit – Transfer manoeuvre between two orbits
  - Orbital insertion – Spaceflight operation
  - Orbital maneuver – Movement during spaceflight
  - Perigee kick motor
- Station-keeping and orbit maintenance
  - Electric propulsion – Type of spacecraft propulsion using electrical energy to accelerate propellant
  - Orbital station-keeping – Maintenance of a particular orbit
  - Reaction control system – Spacecraft thrusters used to provide attitude control and translation
  - Satellite formation flying
  - Sun-synchronous orbit – Type of geocentric orbit
- Orbital decay and deorbiting
  - Aerobraking – Spaceflight maneuver
  - Atmospheric drag – Retarding force on a body moving in a fluid
  - Atmospheric reentry – Passage of an object through the gases of an atmosphere from outer space
  - Deorbit burn
  - Graveyard orbit – Spacecraft end-of-life orbit
  - Orbital decay – Process that leads to gradual decrease of the distance between two orbiting bodies
  - Space debris – Pollution around Earth by defunct artificial objects

== Satellite operations and lifecycle ==
=== Satellite lifecycle ===
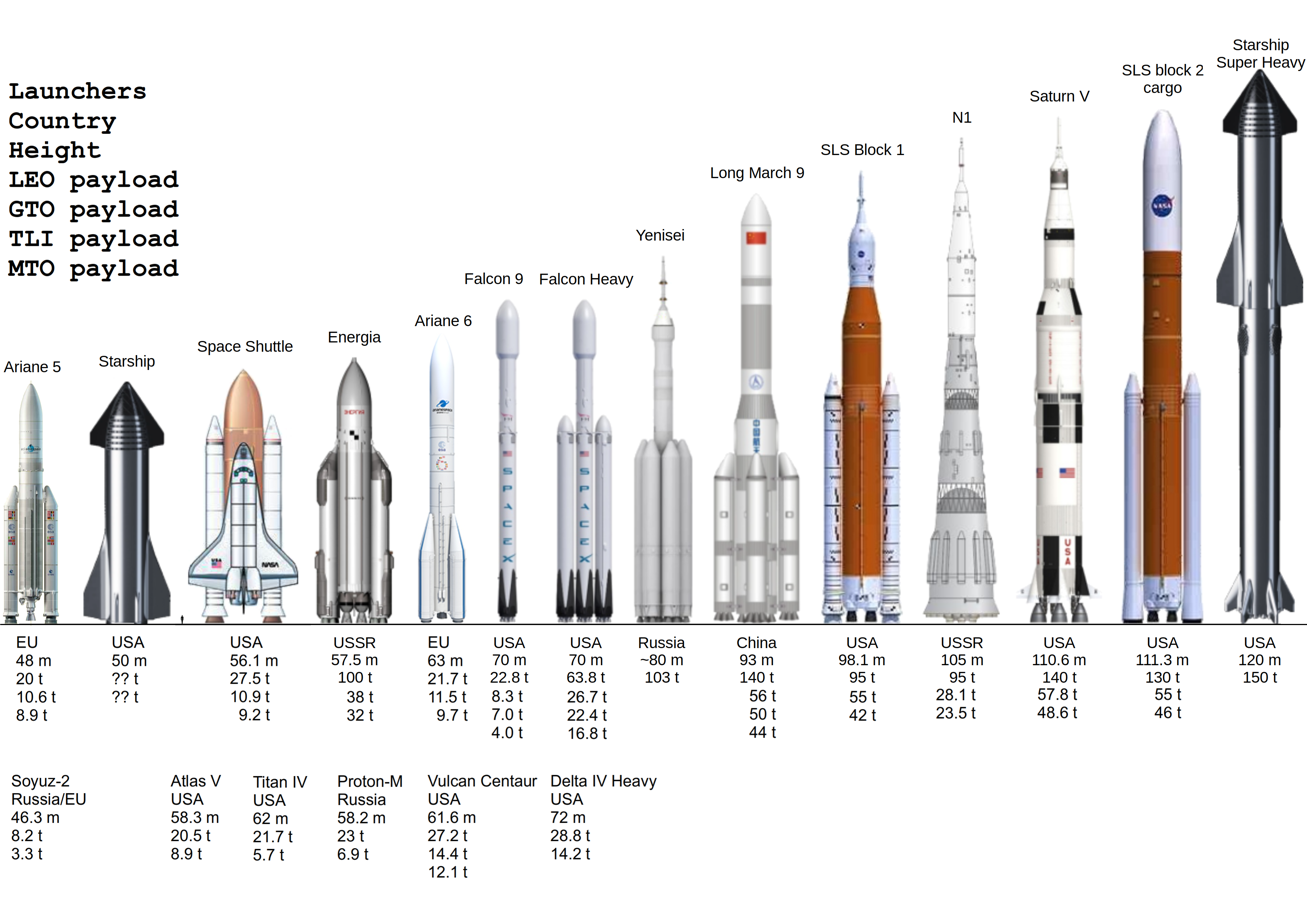
Comparison of launch vehicles. Shownn are payload masses to achieve low earth, geostationary transfer, trans-lunar, and helicentric trans-Martian injection orbits.

The satellite lifecycle runs from mission design and spacecraft integration through launch, deployment, routine operations, servicing, and end-of-mission disposal. It includes the satellite bus, payload, and ground segment needed to support the mission; the launch vehicle, satellite dispenser, and early-orbit checkout and commissioning used to place the spacecraft into service; and later operations such as telemetry, mission control, station-keeping, attitude control, refuelling, passivation, and disposal to reduce space debris.

- Design and mission planning
  - Ground segment – Ground-based elements of a spacecraft system
  - Payload – Carrying capacity of a vehicle
  - Satellite bus – Main body and structural component of the satellite
  - Spacecraft design
- Launch and deployment
  - Launch and Early Orbit phase
  - Launch vehicle – Rocket used to carry a spacecraft into space
  - Rideshare (spaceflight) – Launch of small spacecraft together with larger one
  - Satellite dispenser
- Operations and control
  - Mission control center – Facility that manages aerospace vehicle flights
  - Orbital station-keeping – Maintenance of a particular orbit
  - Spacecraft attitude determination and control – Process of controlling orientation of an aerospace vehicle
  - Telemetry – Automatic collection and transmission of data
- Servicing, disposal, and end of mission
  - Graveyard orbit – Spacecraft end-of-life orbit
  - Mission Extension Vehicle – Spacecraft concept
  - Passivation (spacecraft) – Removal of internal energy in a spaceship at end of its mission
  - Satellite refuelling – Operation of replenishing
  - Space debris – Pollution around Earth by defunct artificial objects

=== Launch and deployment ===
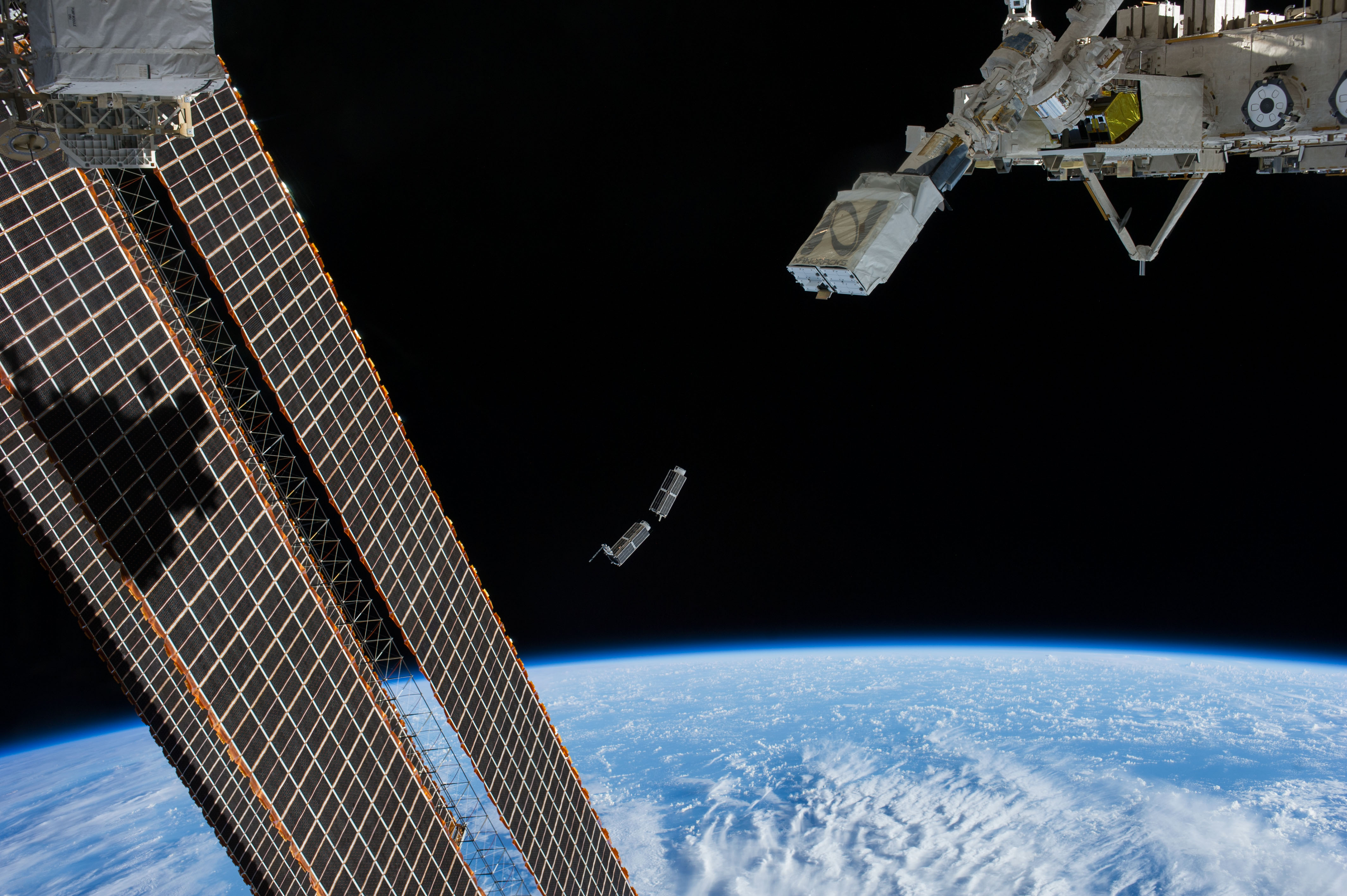
A set of Nanoracks CubeSats is deployed by the Nanoracks CubeSat Deployer attached to the end of the Japanese robotic arm (25 February 2014).

Launch and deployment cover the transition from a completed spacecraft on the ground to an operating satellite in orbit. This phase includes launch-site processing, dedicated or rideshare launch, separation from the launch vehicle or deployer, initial signal acquisition, and commissioning checks that confirm the spacecraft is healthy enough to begin routine operations.

- Commissioning
  - Telemetry – Automatic collection and transmission of data
- Dedicated launches
  - Expendable launch vehicle – Launch system that uses a single use launch vehicle
  - Launch vehicle – Rocket used to carry a spacecraft into space
  - List of Falcon 9 and Falcon Heavy launches
  - Reusable launch vehicle – Vehicles that can go to space and return
- Deployment mechanisms
  - Educational Launch of Nanosatellites – NASA educational satellite program
  - List of spacecraft deployed from the International Space Station
  - Nanoracks CubeSat Deployer – Device to deploy CubeSats into orbit from the International Space Station
  - Satellite dispenser
- Dispensers
  - Nanoracks CubeSat Deployer – Device to deploy CubeSats into orbit from the International Space Station
  - Rocket Lab Photon – Satellite bus made by Rocket Lab
  - Satellite dispenser
- Initial acquisition
  - Telemetry – Automatic collection and transmission of data
- Launch sites
  - Baikonur Cosmodrome – Spaceport in Kazakhstan leased to Russia
  - Guiana Space Centre – French and European spaceport in French Guiana
  - Kennedy Space Center – NASA launch facility in Florida
  - Satish Dhawan Space Centre – Spaceport in Sriharikota, Andhra Pradesh, India
  - Spaceport – Location used to launch and receive spacecraft
- Launch vehicles
  - Launch vehicle – Rocket used to carry a spacecraft into space
  - LauncherOne – Two-stage, air-launched rocket by Virgin Orbit
  - Rocket Lab Electron – Two-stage small launch vehicle, 200–300 kg to LEO
  - Vega – Brightest star in the constellation Lyra
- Rideshare launches
  - List of Falcon 9 and Falcon Heavy launches
  - Rideshare (spaceflight) – Launch of small spacecraft together with larger one
  - Satellite dispenser
- Separation systems
  - Nanoracks CubeSat Deployer – Device to deploy CubeSats into orbit from the International Space Station
  - Satellite dispenser

=== Station-keeping and control ===
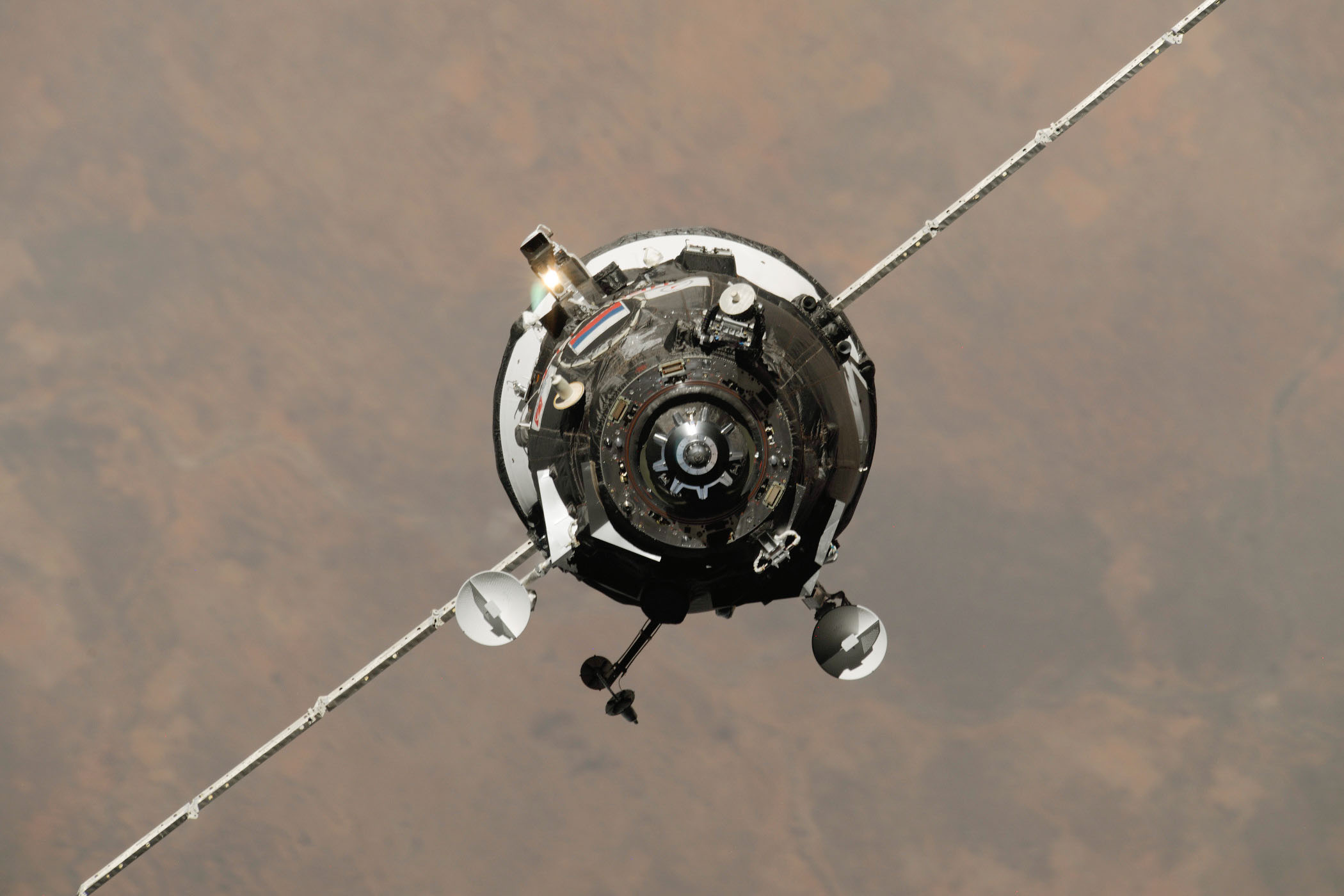
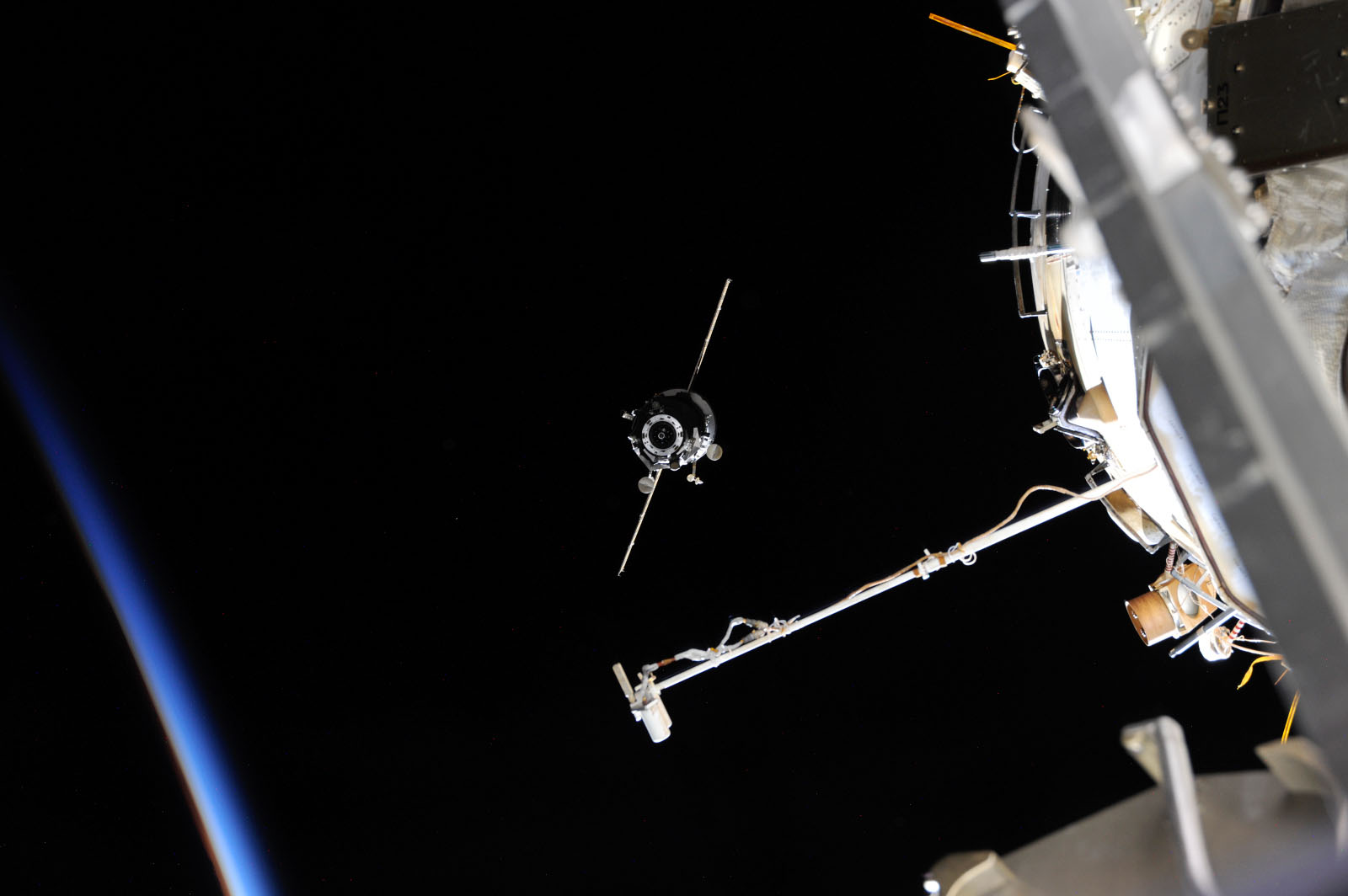
The automated Progress uncrewed spacecraft approaches the International Space Station with tons of food and supplies, and then departs with trash. Progress was then intentionally crashed into the atmosphere for engineering testing.

Station-keeping and control keep a satellite pointed correctly and close to its intended orbit or orbital slot. This work combines guidance, navigation, and control, spacecraft attitude determination and control, autonomous operations, and propulsion systems used for pointing, maneuvering, orbit maintenance, and long-duration station-keeping.

- Attitude control
  - Control moment gyroscope – Attitude control device
  - Guidance, navigation, and control – Branch of engineering
  - Magnetorquer – Satellite system
  - Reaction control system – Spacecraft thrusters used to provide attitude control and translation
  - Reaction wheel – Attitude control device used in spacecraft
  - Spacecraft attitude determination and control – Process of controlling orientation of an aerospace vehicle
- Autonomous control
  - Autonomous robot – Robot that performs behaviors or tasks with a high degree of autonomy
  - Tip and cue – Tracking method in satellite imagery: 2
  - Uncrewed spacecraft – Spacecraft without people on board
- Chemical propulsion
  - Cold gas thruster – Type of rocket engine
  - Liquid-propellant rocket – Rocket engine that uses liquid fuels and oxidizers
  - Monopropellant rocket – Rocket that uses a single propellant with a catalyst
  - Rocket engine – Non-airbreathing engine used to propel a missile or vehicle
- Electric propulsion
  - Arcjet rocket – Type of spacecraft electric propulsion system
  - Hall-effect thruster – Type of electric propulsion system
  - Ion thruster – Form of electric spacecraft propulsion
  - Pulsed plasma thruster – Type of propulsion for spacecraft
  - Resistojet rocket – Method of spacecraft propulsion
  - Solar sail – Space propulsion method using Sun radiation
  - Spacecraft electric propulsion – Type of spacecraft propulsion using electrical energy to accelerate propellant
- Orbit control
  - Orbital maneuver – Movement during spaceflight
  - Orbital station-keeping – Maintenance of a particular orbit
  - Spacecraft flight dynamics – Application of mechanical dynamics to model the flight of space vehicles
  - Spacecraft propulsion – Method used to accelerate spacecraft

=== Servicing and repair ===
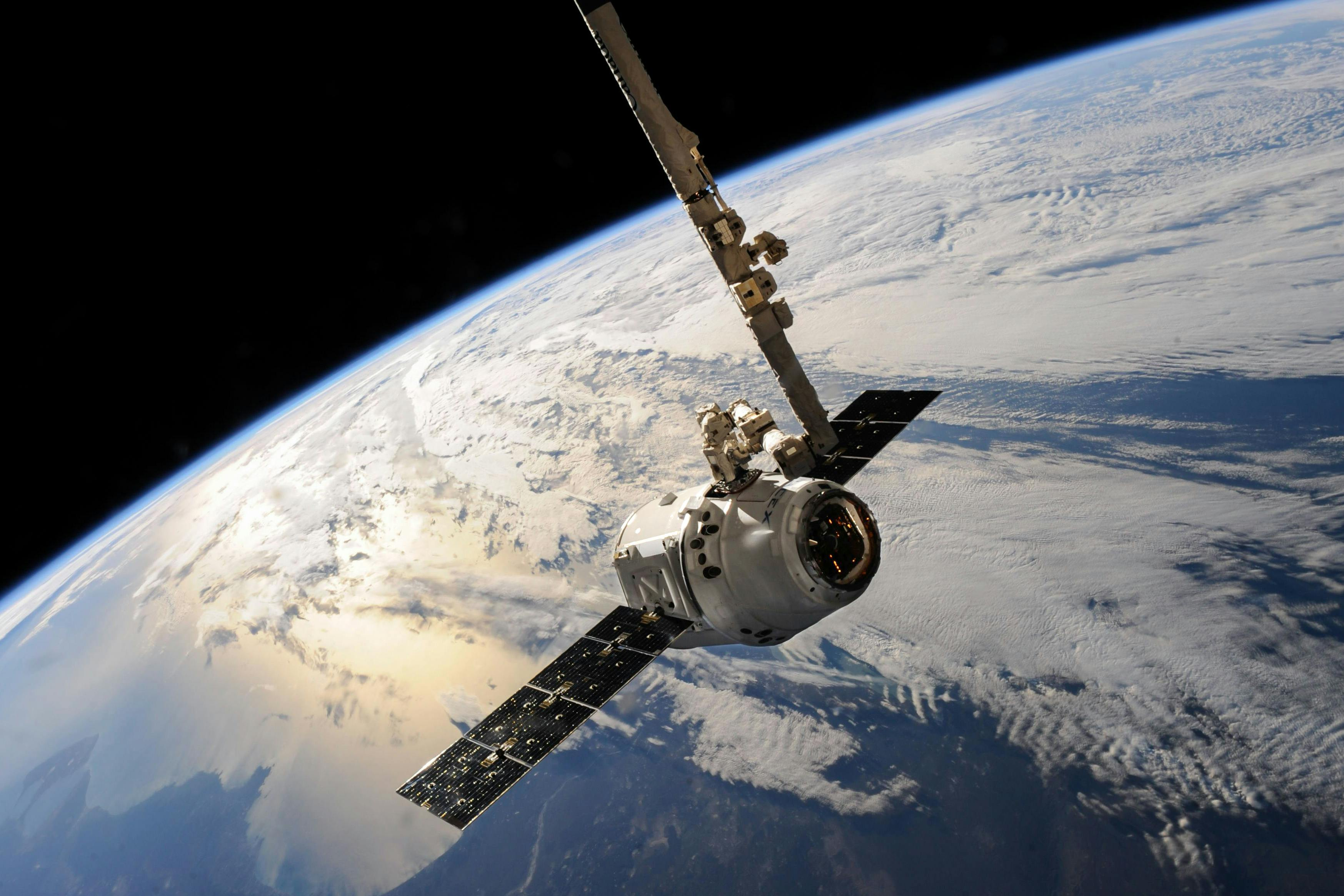
A SpaceX Dragon with satellite refuelling capabilities over Argentina.

Satellite servicing and repair covers crewed and robotic work performed after launch to inspect, repair, refuel, upgrade, relocate, or extend the operating life of spacecraft. It includes astronaut servicing missions, robotic rendezvous and proximity operations, life-extension vehicles, refueling demonstrations, and on-orbit servicing systems for satellites that may or may not have been designed for maintenance.

- Crewed servicing missions
  - Space Shuttle – Partially reusable launch system and space plane
  - STS-61 – 1993 American crewed spaceflight to the Hubble Space Telescope
  - STS-82 – 1997 American crewed spaceflight to the Hubble Space Telescope
  - STS-103 – 1999 American crewed spaceflight to the Hubble Space Telescope
  - STS-109 – 2002 American crewed spaceflight to the Hubble Space Telescope
  - STS-125 – 2009 American crewed spaceflight to the Hubble Space Telescope
- Inspection
  - Autonomous Nanosatellite Guardian for Evaluating Local Space
  - DART (satellite) – NASA Autonomous Rendezvous demo 2005
  - E.Inspector – European technology demonstration cubesat
  - Orbital Express – US project to autonomously service satellites in orbit ~2007
  - Passive Inspection CubeSat – Technology demonstration cubesat
  - Prowler (satellite) – American satellite used to study Soviet satellites
  - XSS-10 – Micro-spacecraft developed by U.S. Air Force
- Life extension
  - MEV-1 (spacecraft) – Spacecraft concept
  - MEV-2 – Spacecraft concept
  - Mission Extension Vehicle – Spacecraft concept
  - OSAM-1 – NASA Spacecraft
- On-orbit servicing
  - Consortium for Execution of Rendezvous and Servicing Operations – Program started by the Defense Advanced Research Projects Agency
  - Orbital Express – US project to autonomously service satellites in orbit ~2007
  - Repair Satellite Prototype – 2018 microsatellite with two robotic arms
  - Robotic Servicing of Geosynchronous Satellites program – Satellite-servicing project
  - Satellite refuelling – Operation of replenishing
  - Space Infrastructure Servicing – Canadian spacecraft concept for in-orbit servicing
- Refueling
  - OSAM-1 – NASA Spacecraft
  - Robotic Refueling Mission
  - Satellite refuelling – Operation of replenishing
- Relocation
  - MEV-1 (spacecraft) – Spacecraft concept
  - MEV-2 – Spacecraft concept
  - Mission Extension Vehicle – Spacecraft concept
- Repair
  - Intelsat VI – Series of satellites
  - Repair Satellite Prototype – 2018 microsatellite with two robotic arms
  - Solar Maximum Mission – NASA solar observatory (1980–1989)
- Robotic servicing
  - Canadarm2 – Robotic system on board the International Space Station
  - Dextre – Robotic arm on ISS
  - Orbital Express – US project to autonomously service satellites in orbit ~2007
  - OSAM-1 – NASA Spacecraft
  - Robotic Refueling Mission
  - Robotic Servicing of Geosynchronous Satellites program – Satellite-servicing project

=== End of life and disposal ===
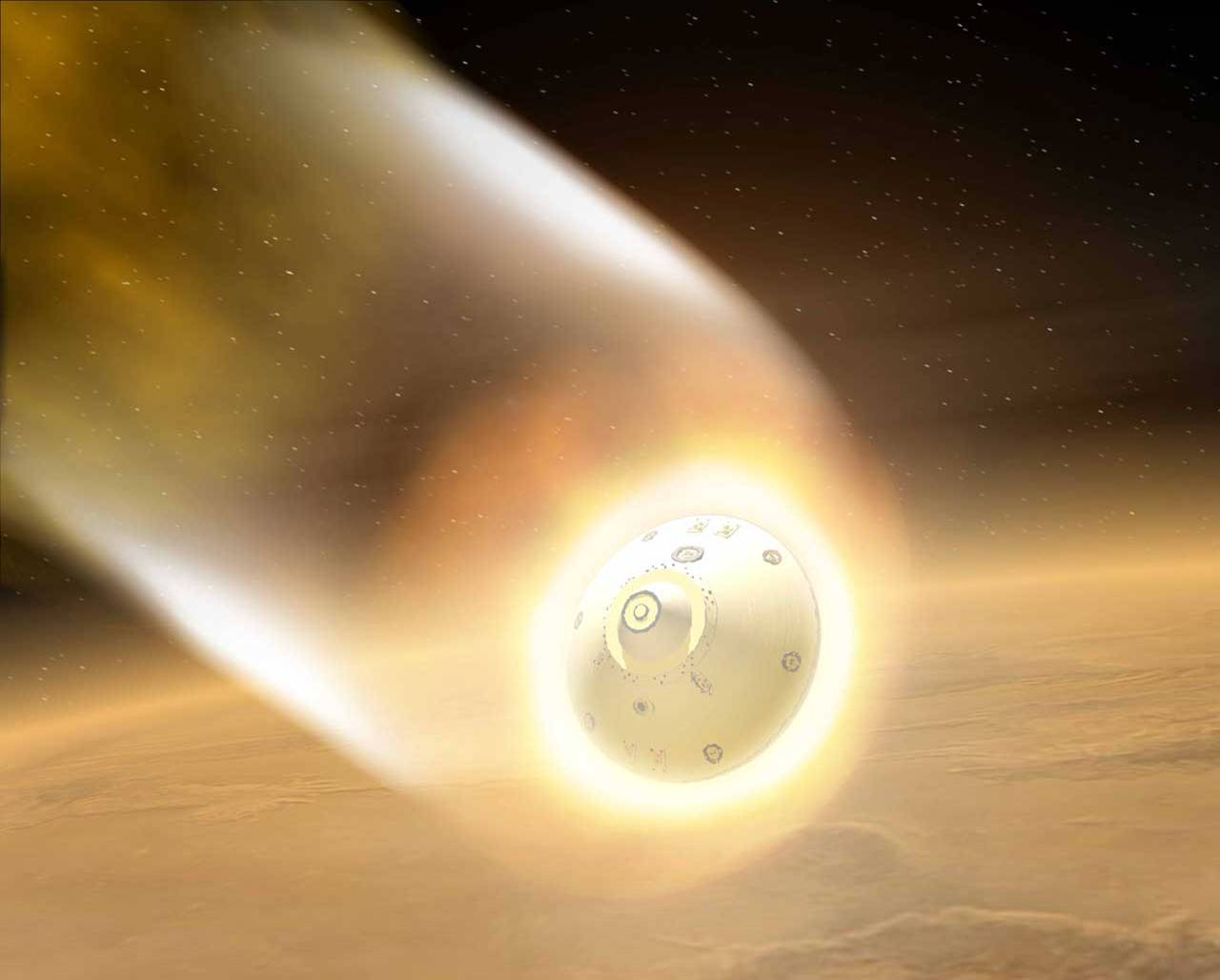
Artistic rendering of the Mars Exploration Rover during atmospheric reentry, its aeroshell engulfed in plasma.

End-of-life and disposal practices remove satellites and orbital stages from operational regions after their missions end to reduce collision and debris risk. Disposal can involve controlled or uncontrolled atmospheric reentry, transfer to a less congested orbit or a graveyard orbit, passivation, later active debris removal, or compliance with post-mission debris-mitigation guidelines.

- Controlled reentry
  - Deorbit of Mir – Controlled atmospheric entry of Mir over the Pacific
  - Salyut 7 – Soviet space station (1982–1991)
- Deorbiting
  - ClearSpace-1 – Planned European mission to demonstrate space debris removal
  - e.Deorbit – Cancelled mission to remove space debris
  - Graveyard orbit – Spacecraft end-of-life orbit
  - List of reentering space debris
  - List of space debris producing events
  - RemoveDEBRIS – Project to demonstrate various space debris removal technologies
- Post-mission disposal guidelines
  - Inter-Agency Space Debris Coordination Committee – Inter-governmental forum
- Uncontrolled reentry
  - Kosmos 954 – Reconnaissance satellite of Soviet Union
  - Salyut 7 – Soviet space station (1982–1991)
  - Tiangong-1 – Chinese space station (2011–2018)
  - Upper Atmosphere Research Satellite – NASA-operated orbital observatory (1991–2011)

== Satellite industry and organizations ==
=== Manufacturers ===
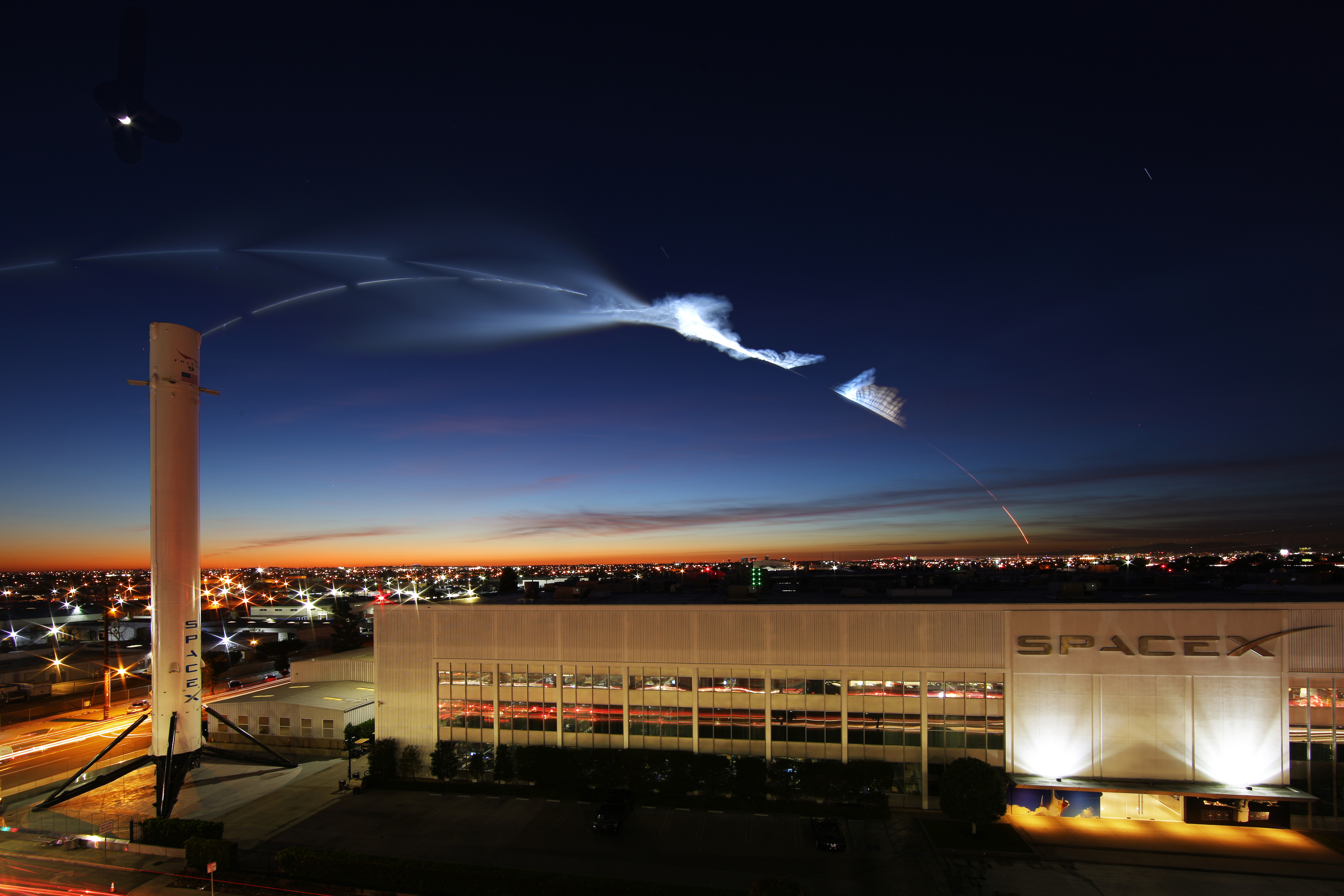
A SpaceX Falcon 9 launch from Vandenberg Space Force Base.

- Launch and deployment service providers
  - Launch service providers
    - Arianespace – European commercial space transportation company
    - Firefly Aerospace – American aerospace company
    - Rocket Lab – American public spaceflight company
    - SpaceX – American spaceflight and AI company
    - United Launch Alliance – Joint venture of Lockheed Martin and Boeing
  - Satellite deployment and rideshare
    - D-Orbit – Private Italian aerospace company
    - Exolaunch – European satellite launch provider
    - Momentus Space – American aerospace company
    - Nanoracks – American private space hardware and services company
  - Servicing, logistics, and situational support
    - Astroscale – Orbital debris removal company
    - ClearSpace-1 – Planned European mission to demonstrate space debris removal
    - Impulse Space – American space company
    - Kongsberg Satellite Services – Norwegian satellite ground station services company
    - LeoLabs – American space technology company
- Payload manufacturers
  - Aerojet Rocketdyne – American aerospace propulsion manufacturer
  - Beyond Gravity – Swiss aerospace company
  - Honeywell – American multinational conglomerate
  - L3Harris Technologies – American defense and electrical equipment manufacturer
  - Leonardo S.p.A. – Italian defence and aerospace company
  - Moog Inc. – American aerospace company
  - Teledyne Technologies – American industrial company
- Satellite bus manufacturers
  - Large satellite bus manufacturers
    - Airbus Defence and Space – Division of Airbus
    - Boeing Satellite Development Center – Satellite manufacturing division of Boeing
    - China Academy of Space Technology – Chinese research institute
    - Israel Aerospace Industries – Aerospace and defense manufacturer
    - Lockheed Martin Space – Operating division of Lockheed Martin
    - Maxar Technologies – American space technology company (2017–2025)
    - Mitsubishi Electric – Japanese electrical equipment, elevator manufacturer, and appliance manufacturer
    - Northrop Grumman – American aerospace and defense company
    - OHB SE – Aerospace company in Bremen, Germany
    - Reshetnev Information Satellite Systems – Russian satellite manufacturing company
    - Space Systems/Loral – American satellite and space systems manufacturer
    - Thales Alenia Space – Satellite manufacturer
  - Specialized and medium-class manufacturers
    - AAC Clyde Space – Private space company
    - Ball Aerospace & Technologies – American aerospace company (1956–2024)
    - Blue Canyon Technologies – American defense contractor
    - EnduroSat – Bulgarian aerospace manufacturer
    - GomSpace – Nanosatellite manufacturing company
    - MDA Space – Canadian space technology company
    - NanoAvionics – Small satellite bus manufacturer and mission integrator
    - Satrec Initiative – South Korean aerospace company
    - Sierra Nevada Corporation – American aerospace company, founded 1963
    - Surrey Satellite Technology – British aerospace company

=== Operators ===
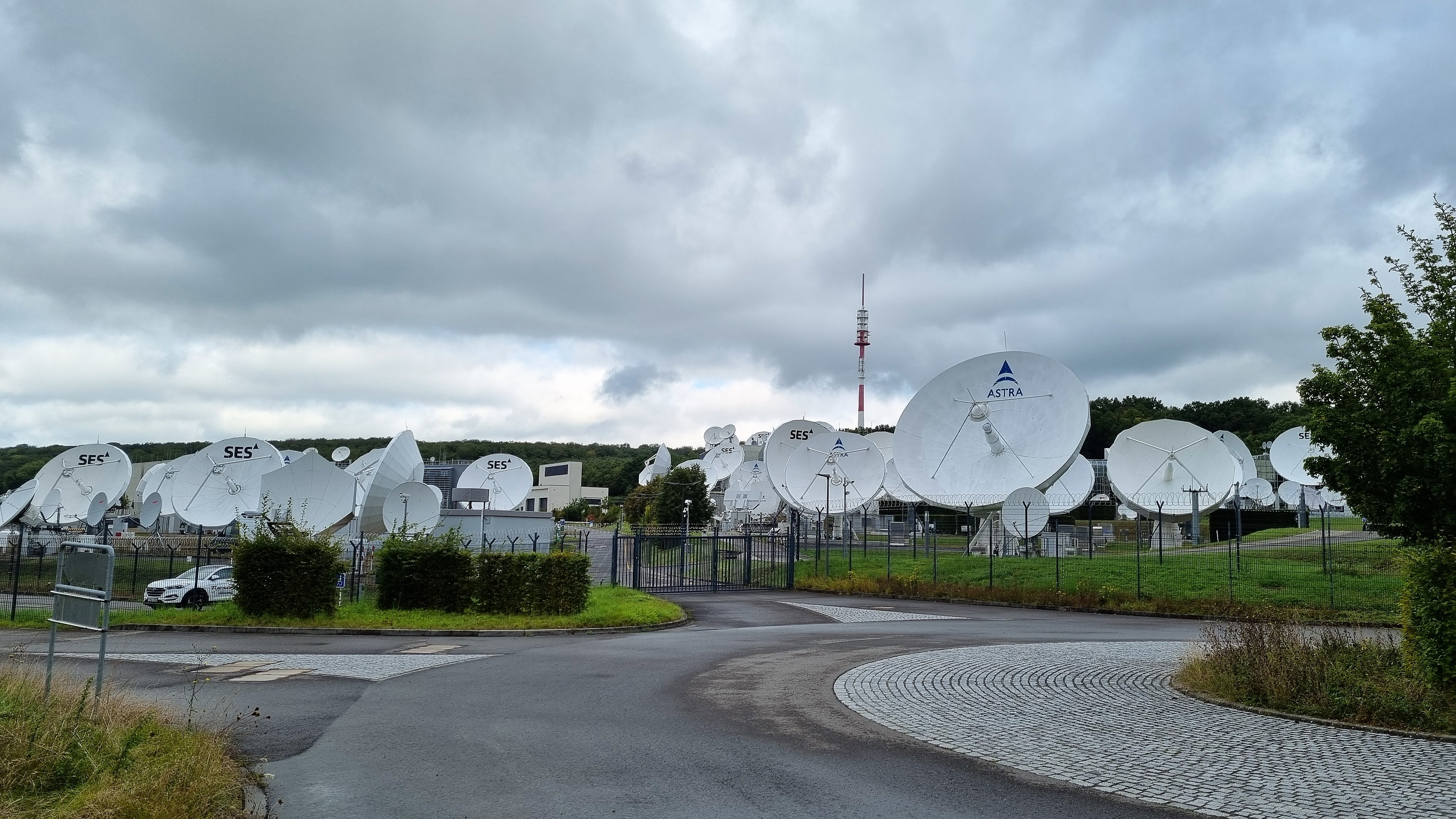
Satellite uplink dishes at SES S.A. in Betzdorf, Luxembourg.

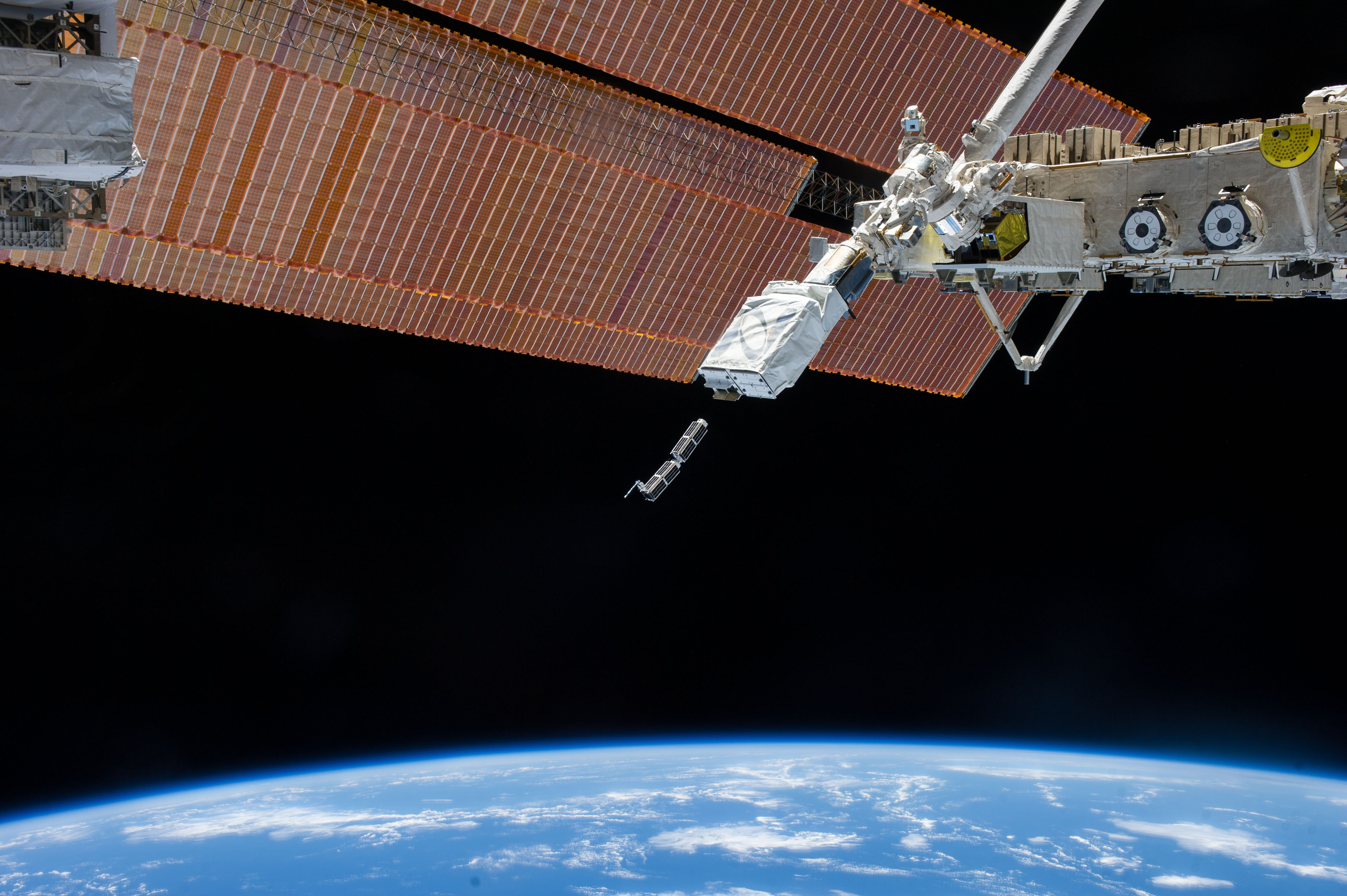
First pair of twenty-eight (28) Planet Labs satellites launched from the International Space Station via the NanoRacks CubeSat Deployer in 2014.

- Commercial constellation operators
  - AST SpaceMobile – American satellite manufacturer
  - Lynk Global – American satellite communications company
  - Project Kuiper – Amazon satellite constellation and internet service
  - Telesat Lightspeed – Canadian satellite communications company
- Communications satellite operators
  - Global and multinational communications operators
    - EchoStar – Global satellite services provider
    - Eutelsat – French-based satellite provider
    - Hughes Network Systems – High-speed satellite internet service provider
    - Intelsat – Luxembourgish communications satellite services provider
    - Iridium Communications – American satellite communications company
    - SES S.A. – Communications satellite owner and operator
    - Telesat – Canadian satellite communications company
    - Viasat – American communications company
  - Low Earth orbit and mobile communications operators
    - O3b – Group of telecommunications satellites
    - Orbcomm – American wireless networking and telecommunications company
    - Starlink – SpaceX satellite Internet constellation
    - Swarm Technologies – US telecommunications company
  - Regional communications operators
    - ABS (satellite operator) – Dubai-based operator of communication satellites
    - APT Satellite Holdings – Bermuda-incorporated holding company
    - Arabsat – Arab satellite operator
    - AsiaSat – Hong Kong-based commercial operator of communications satellites
    - Avanti Communications
    - Hispasat – Spanish satellite operator
    - JSAT Corporation – First private Japanese satellite operator
    - Spacecom – Israeli communications satellite operator
    - Thaicom – Thai company
    - Yahsat – Satellite communications company
- Earth observation satellite operators
  - Commercial Earth observation operators
    - Airbus Defence and Space – Division of Airbus
    - Black Sky Aerospace – Australian aerospace company
    - BlackSky Technology Inc. - American aerospace company
    - Capella Space – American space company
    - DigitalGlobe – American space imagery company
    - GeoEye – American commercial satellite imaging company
    - ICEYE – Finnish microsatellite manufacturer
    - ImageSat International – Israeli commercial Earth observation satellite series
    - Maxar Technologies – American space technology company (2017–2025)
    - Planet Labs – American space technology company
    - Satellogic – American space technology company
    - SI Imaging Services – South Korean aerospace company
    - Skybox Imaging – Constellation of small Earth observation satellites
    - Spire Global – Space-to-cloud data and analytics company
  - Government and public Earth observation operators
    - U.S. Geological Survey – Scientific agency of the US government
- Military satellite operators
  - Aerospace Force of the Islamic Revolutionary Guard Corps – Aerospace service branch of Iran's Islamic Revolutionary Guard Corps
  - Defence Space Agency – Indian Armed Forces Agency/Unit responsible for space warfare
  - National Geospatial-Intelligence Agency – US DoD division
  - Space Operations Command – U.S. Space Force command
  - Space Systems Command – U.S. Space Force space development, acquisition, launch, and logistics field command
- Navigation satellite operators
  - Cabinet Office (Japan) – Agency in the Cabinet of Japan
  - European Union Agency for the Space Programme – Agency of the European Union
    - Galileo (satellite navigation) – European global navigation satellite system
  - Indian Space Research Organisation – Indian national space and aeronautics agency
    - Indian Regional Navigation Satellite System – Satellite navigation system
  - Roscosmos – Space agency of Russia
    - GLONASS – Russian global navigation satellite system
  - Satellite-based augmentation system – Method of improving a navigation system
  - U.S. Space Force – Space service branch of the U.S. military
    - Global Positioning System – American satellite-based radio navigation service
    - GPS satellite blocks – Generations of US navigation satellites

=== Space agencies ===
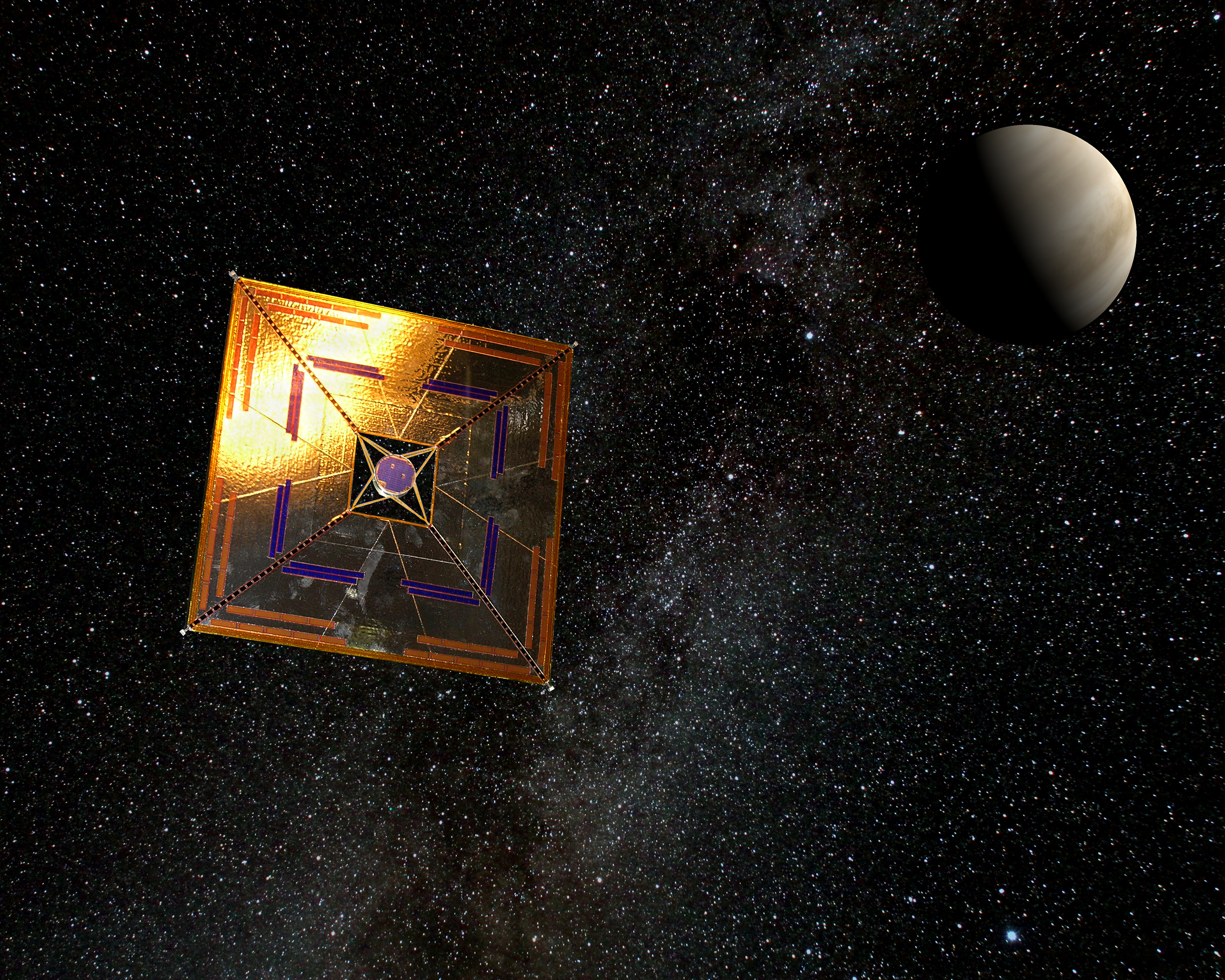
Depiction of the Japan Aerospace Exploration Agency's IKAROS, the first craft with solar sails as main propulsion system. IKAROS launched with Akatsuiki, the Venus climate orbiter, from Tanegashima Space Center.

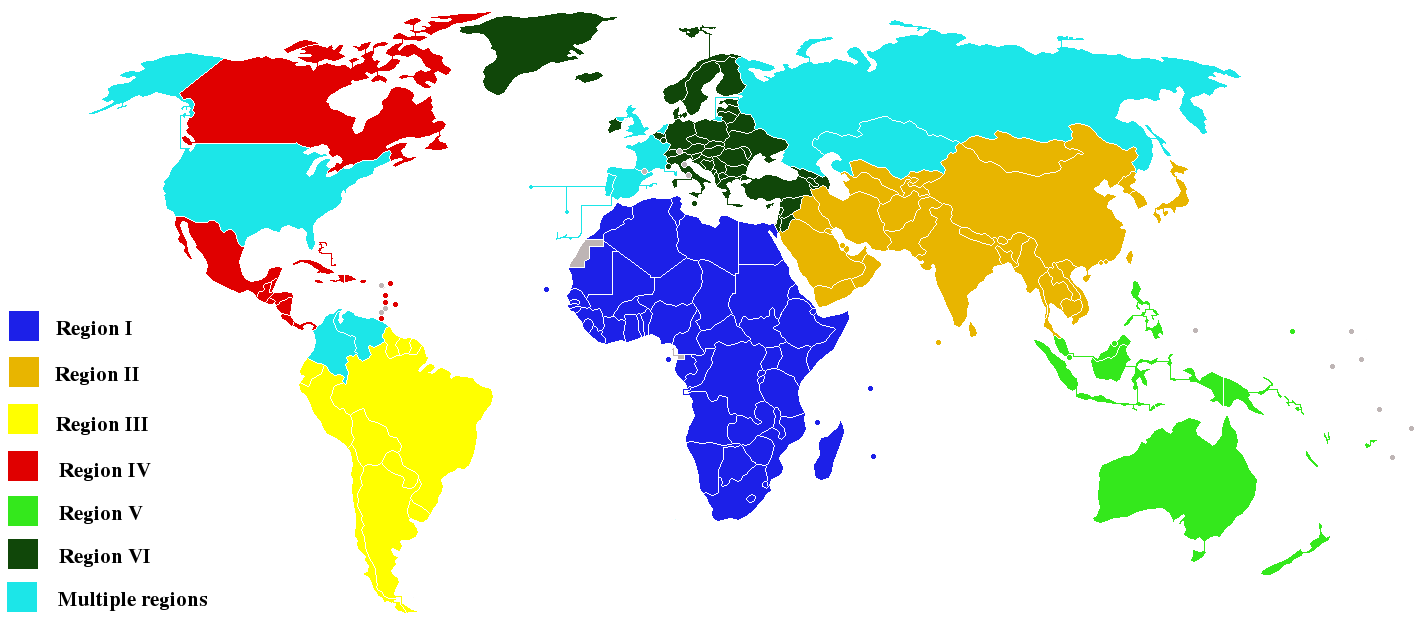
The member states of the World Meteorological Organization divided into their six regional associations, shown on a world map.

- Civil space agencies
  - African civil space agencies
    - Egyptian Space Agency – Official Egyptian space program
    - National Space Research and Development Agency – National space agency of Nigeria
    - South African National Space Agency – Space agency of the South African government
  - Asian civil space agencies
    - China National Space Administration – National space agency of the People's Republic of China
    - Indian Space Research Organisation – Indian national space and aeronautics agency
    - Iranian Space Agency – Iran's governmental space agency
    - Israel Space Agency – Government space agency of Israel
    - Japan Aerospace Exploration Agency – Japan's national air and space agency
    - Korea AeroSpace Administration – South Korean government agency
    - Mohammed bin Rashid Space Centre – Dubai government entity
    - United Arab Emirates Space Agency – Government agency
  - European civil space agencies
    - European Space Agency – European organisation dedicated to space exploration
    - German Aerospace Center – German research center for aerospace and power engineering
    - Italian Space Agency – Italian government agency
    - Norwegian Space Agency – Government agency of the Norwegian space programme
    - Polish Space Agency – Polish state space agency
    - Portuguese Space Agency
    - Roscosmos – Space agency of Russia
    - Spanish Space Agency – Spanish agency for Space affairs
    - Swedish National Space Agency – Swedish Government organisation
    - UK Space Agency – Space agency of the UK Government
  - Global and multinational agencies
    - European Space Agency – European organisation dedicated to space exploration
  - North American civil space agencies
    - Canadian Space Agency – Government agency
    - Mexican Space Agency – National space agency of Mexico
    - NASA – American space and aeronautics agency
  - Oceanian civil space agencies
    - Australian Space Agency – Space-related agency of the Australian government
    - New Zealand Space Agency
  - South American civil space agencies
    - Brazilian Space Agency – Space program agency of Brazil
    - CONAE – Argentine space agency
- International space organizations
  - Committee on Earth Observation Satellites – International organization
  - Group on Earth Observations – Scientific coordination organization
  - International Astronautical Federation – International space advocacy organization
  - International Charter Space and Major Disasters – Non-binding multinational alliance
  - International Telecommunication Union – Specialized agency of the United Nations
  - United Nations Committee on the Peaceful Uses of Outer Space – United Nations committee
  - United Nations Office for Outer Space Affairs – Space agency
- Meteorological satellite agencies
  - Meteorological satellite agencies by country
    - China Meteorological Administration – Meteorological agency of the People's Republic of China
    - India Meteorological Department – Meteorological agency of the Government of India
    - Japan Meteorological Agency – National meteorological service of Japan
    - Korea Meteorological Administration – Meteorological service of South Korea
    - National Oceanic and Atmospheric Administration – US government scientific agency
  - Global and international meteorological satellite agencies
    - Coordination Group for Meteorological Satellites
    - European Organisation for the Exploitation of Meteorological Satellites – European intergovernmental organisation
    - World Meteorological Organization – Specialized agency of the United Nations
- Military space agencies
  - Chinese military space agencies
    - People's Liberation Army Strategic Support Force – Former cyber and space force of the People's Liberation Army (2015–2024)
  - French military space agencies
    - French Space Command – Space command of the French Air and Space Force
  - Indian military space agencies
    - Defence Space Agency – Indian Armed Forces Agency/Unit responsible for space warfare
  - Iranian military space agencies
    - Aerospace Force of the Islamic Revolutionary Guard Corps – Aerospace service branch of Iran's Islamic Revolutionary Guard Corps
  - Russian military space agencies
    - Russian Space Forces – Branch of the Russian Aerospace Forces
  - U.S. military space agencies
    - Space Development Agency – U.S. federal agency
    - Space Operations Command – U.S. Space Force command
    - Space Systems Command – U.S. Space Force space development, acquisition, launch, and logistics field command
    - U.S. Space Command – Unified command of the U.S. Department of Defense
    - U.S. Space Force – Space service branch of the U.S. military

== Satellite programs, series, and constellations ==
=== Communications programs and constellations ===
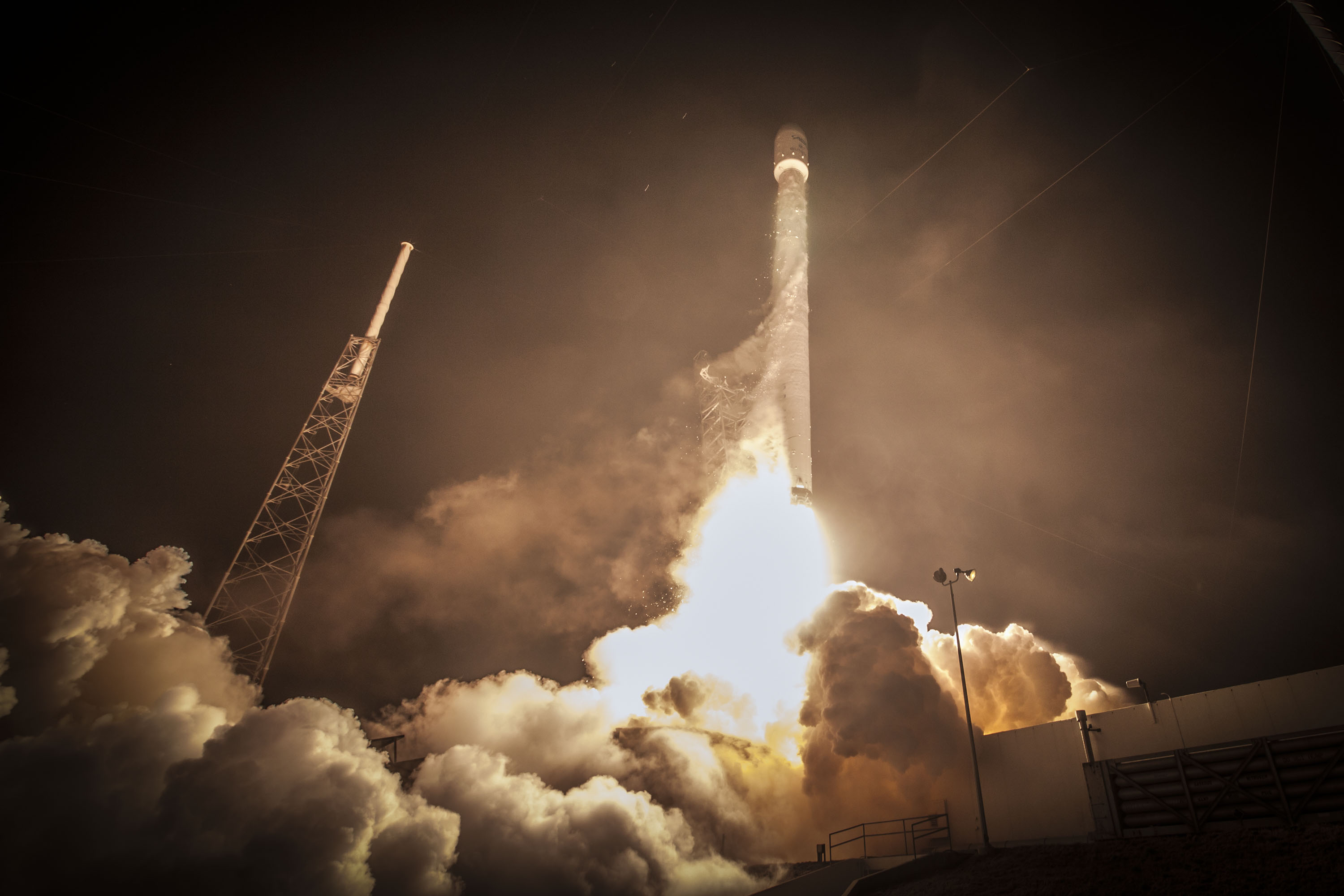
The launch of the Falcon 9 rocket carrying Arabsat-6A.

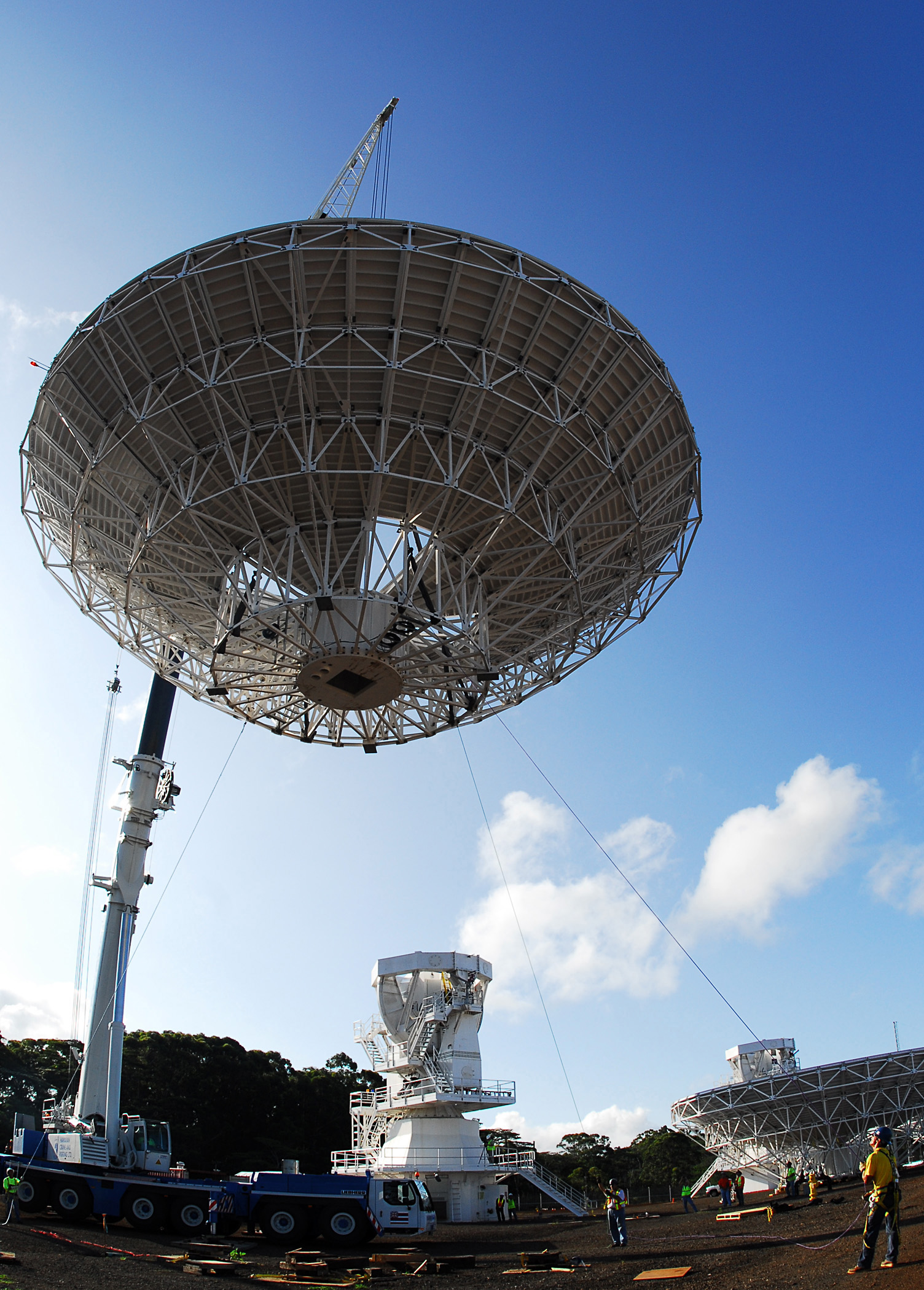
The installation of a Mobile User Objective System satellite dish at NCTAMS PAC in Wahiawā, Hawaii.

Communications satellite programs include geostationary systems that provide services from apparently fixed positions, non-geostationary constellations in low or medium Earth orbit that provide broadband coverage, and mobile-satellite systems that support users away from fixed terminals. Government and relay systems add specialized links for military, tactical, civil-space, or spacecraft-to-ground communications, including inter-satellite relay networks that pass mission data through other spacecraft.

- Geostationary communications satellite series
  - ABS-3A – All-electric geostationary communications satellite
  - Afghansat 1 – Communications satellite
  - Amazonas 5 – Spanish communications satellite
  - Arabsat-6A – Saudi Arabian communications satellite
  - AsiaSat 3S – Asiasat communications satellite
  - Astra 1M – Communications satellite
  - Atlantic Bird – Series of satellites
  - Azerspace-1/Africasat-1a – Azerbaijani communications satellite
  - Azerspace-2 – Telecommunications satellite
  - Badr-4
  - Belintersat-1 – Telecommunications satellite
  - BulgariaSat-1 – Geostationary communications satellite
  - Hot Bird – French satellite company
  - Telkom-4 – Indonesian communications satellite
  - Yuri (satellite) – Japanese satellite
- Low Earth orbit broadband constellations
  - Atlantic Constellation – European constellation of Earth observation satellites
  - Balkan Constellation – European satellite constellation for Earth observation
  - Bureau 1440 – Russian satellite internet constellation
  - E-Space – Satellite communications company
  - Hydra (satellite constellation) – Spanish thermal imaging satellite constellation
- Mobile communications constellations
  - ACeS
  - AfriStar – Satellite
  - AsiaStar – American space communications satellite
  - Garuda 1 – Indonesian communications satellite
  - SkyTerra – Former telecommunications company
  - TerreStar-1
- Government communications systems
  - Blagovest (satellite) – Russian military satellite system
  - Mobile User Objective System – US Space Force communications satellite system
  - MUOS-5 – US Navy Comsat satellite
  - Satellite Data System – American military satellite communication system
  - SICRAL 1B – Italian military communications satellite
  - TacSat-1
  - TacSat-2 – US military satellite
  - TacSat-3 – U.S. military satellite
  - TacSat-5
  - Tactical Satellite Program – US Air Force series of satellites
- Commercial communications operators
  - Astranis – American satellite company
  - Azercosmos – Space Agency of Azerbaijan
  - Bangladesh Satellite Company Limited – Bangladesh government-owned company
  - Broadcasting Satellite System Corporation – Japanese satellite operator
  - Telkom Indonesia – Indonesian telecommunications company
- Inter-satellite relay systems
  - HydRON – European satellite communication constellation project
  - Laser Communications Relay Demonstration – NASA payload launched in 2021
  - MUBLCOM

=== Earth observation programs ===
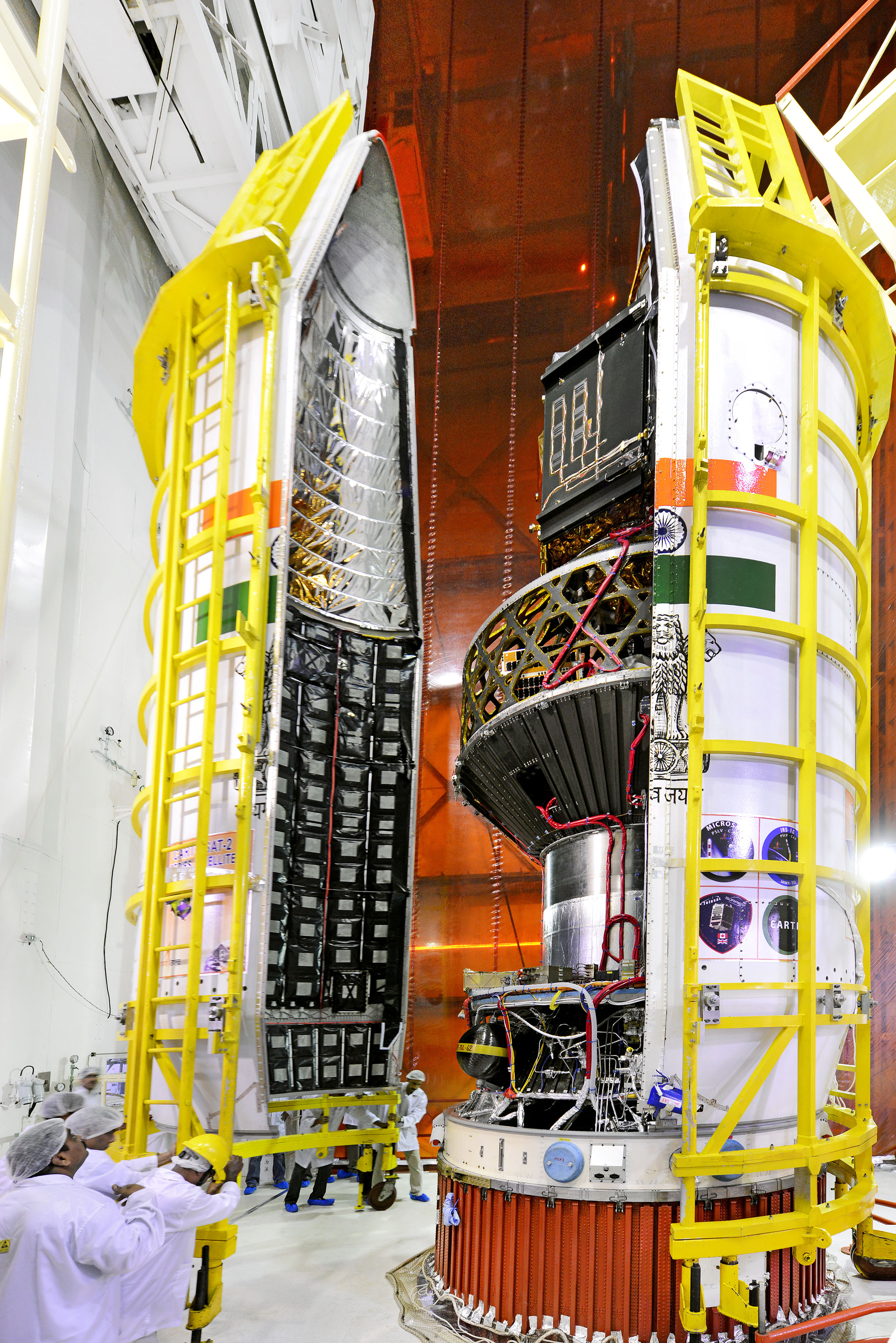
The Indian Space Research Organisation's Cartosat-2D, which achieved sun-synchronous orbit as a Cartosat earth observation satellite.

Earth observation programs use satellites and constellations to collect repeated measurements of Earth's land, oceans, atmosphere, ice, and human activity. Major programs include long-running public missions such as Landsat, the Copernicus Programme, Earth Observing System, Cartosat, along with disaster-monitoring and commercial imaging constellations.

- Landsat program
  - Landsat 2 – American earth observation satellite (1975–1982)
  - Landsat 3 – American earth observation satellite (1978–1983)
  - Landsat 4 – American earth observation satellite (1982–2001)
  - Landsat 6 – American earth observation satellite
- Sentinel satellites
  - Sentinel-1A – European radar imaging satellite
  - Sentinel-1B – European radar imaging satellite
  - Sentinel-1C – European radar imaging satellite
  - Sentinel-2A – European optical imaging satellite
  - Sentinel-2B – European optical imaging satellite
  - Sentinel-2C – European optical imaging satellite
  - Sentinel-3A – ESA Earth observation satellite
  - Sentinel-3B – ESA Earth observation satellite
- Earth Observing System
  - Earth Observing System – NASA program involving satellites
  - Earth Observing-1 – Former Earth Observation Satellite
- Cartosat satellites
  - Cartosat-1 – Indian earth observation satellite
  - Cartosat-2 – Indian Earth observation satellite
  - Cartosat-2A – Indian Earth observation satellite, 2008–2025
  - Cartosat-2B – Indian earth observation satellite
  - Cartosat-2C – Indian earth observation satellite
  - Cartosat-2D – Indian earth observation satellite
  - Cartosat-2E – Indian earth observation satellite
  - Cartosat-2F – Indian earth observation satellite
  - Cartosat-3 – Indian earth observation satellite
- Resourcesat satellites
  - Resourcesat-1 – Indian earth observation satellite
  - Resourcesat-2A – Indian Earth observation satellite
- Disaster Monitoring Constellation
  - Deimos-1 – Spanish Earth imaging satellite
  - UK-DMC 2 – British remote sensing satellite
- Commercial Earth imaging constellations
  - BlackSky Pathfinder-1 – Earth imaging satellite launched in 2016
  - Dove-2 – Earth observation satellite
  - ÑuSat – Series of Argentinean commercial Earth observation satellites
  - SkySat – Constellation of small Earth observation satellites
  - WorldView-1 – Commercial Earth observation satellite
  - WorldView-2 – Commercial Earth observation satellite
  - WorldView-4 – American Earth observation satellite

=== Military and reconnaissance programs ===
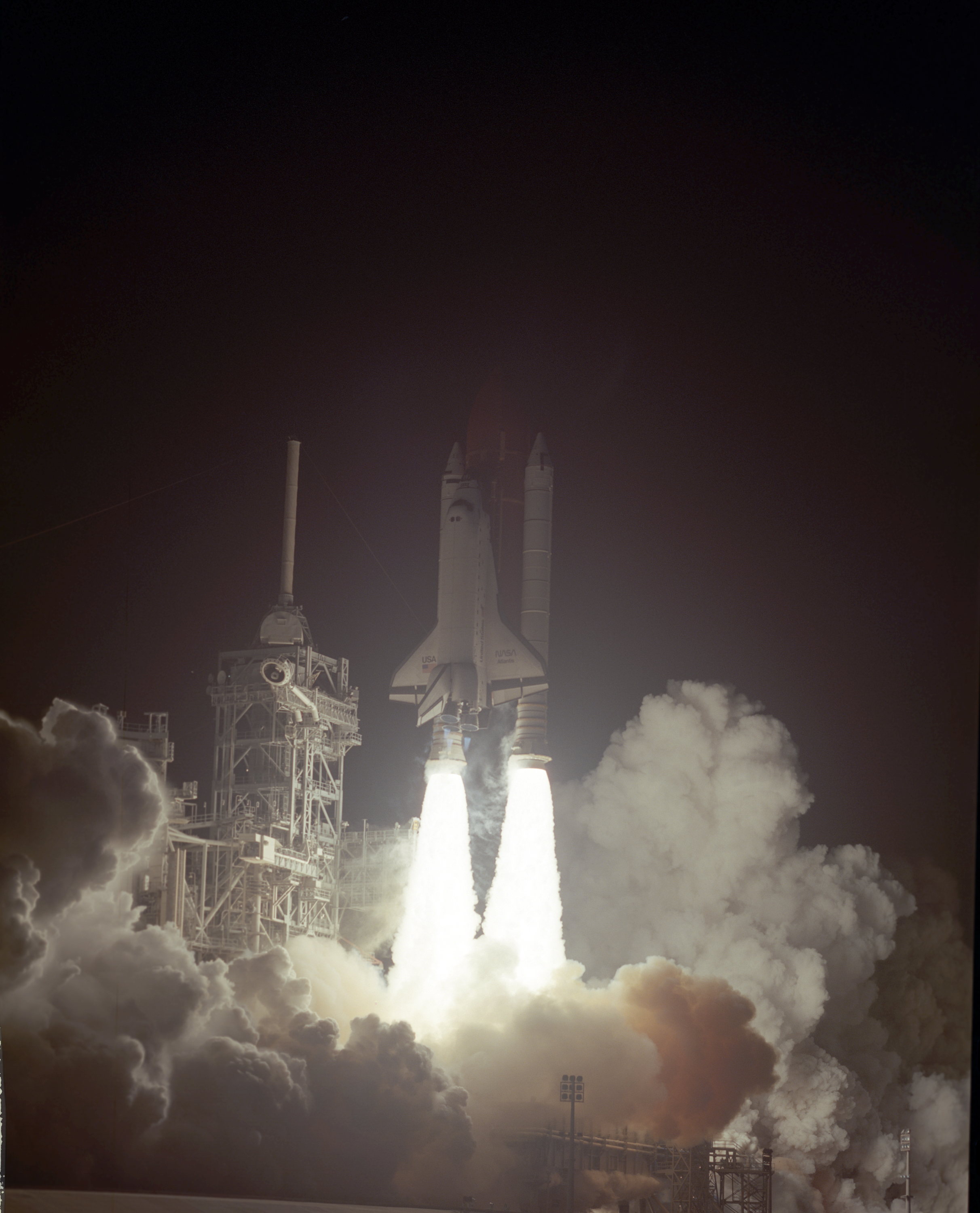
STS-36 launch for Atlantis, which deployed the U.S. National Reconnaissance Office's classified stealth technology reconnaissance satellites under the Zirconic program.

Military and reconnaissance satellites, spacecraft, and constellations are built for defense communications, missile warning, surveillance, and intelligence collection. They include generations of secure communications systems, infrared warning constellations, and photographic, electro-optical, radar, signals-intelligence, and other reconnaissance programs operated by national security agencies and armed forces.

- Advanced Extremely High Frequency
  - Advanced Extremely High Frequency – Series of American military communications satellites
  - Defense Satellite Communications System – Defense satellite communications project
  - Milstar – Constellation of American military satellites
- Corona program
  - CORONA (satellite) – American reconnaissance satellites (1959–1972)
  - Discoverer 1 – American reconnaissance satellite launched in 1959; failed to achieve orbit
  - Discoverer 13 – American reconnaissance satellite
  - Discoverer 14 – American reconnaissance satellite
  - KH-7 Gambit – Series of United States reconnaissance satellites
  - KH-8 Gambit 3 – Series of United States reconnaissance satellites
  - KH-9 Hexagon – American family of spy satellites
- Defense Support Program
  - Defense Support Program – US infrared satellite early warning system
  - Next-Generation Overhead Persistent Infrared – American ballistic defense program
  - Overhead Persistent Infrared
  - Space-Based Infrared System – Missile warning and defence system
- Indian reconnaissance programs
  - Space Based Surveillance project (India) – Multi-phased Indian programme to launch spy satellites
- Keyhole satellites
  - Enhanced Imaging System – American reconnaissance satellite program
  - Future Imagery Architecture – American spy satellite program
  - KH-11 KENNEN – Type of American spy satellite
  - Zirconic – US spy satellite program
- Lacrosse satellites
  - COSMO-SkyMed – Italian radar observation satellite system
  - Onyx (satellite) – Series of American terrestrial radar imaging reconnaissance satellites
  - SAR-Lupe – German military reconnaissance satellite system
  - TerraSAR-X – German Earth observation satellite
- Oko satellites
  - Oko – Soviet (now Russian) satellite-based early warning system for ballistic missiles
- Skynet satellites
  - Airbus Defence and Space – Division of Airbus
  - Ministry of Defence (United Kingdom) – UK Government department responsible for defence
  - Skynet (satellite) – Communications satellite
- Yaogan satellites
  - Yaogan – Chinese military reconnaissance satellite program

=== Navigation systems ===
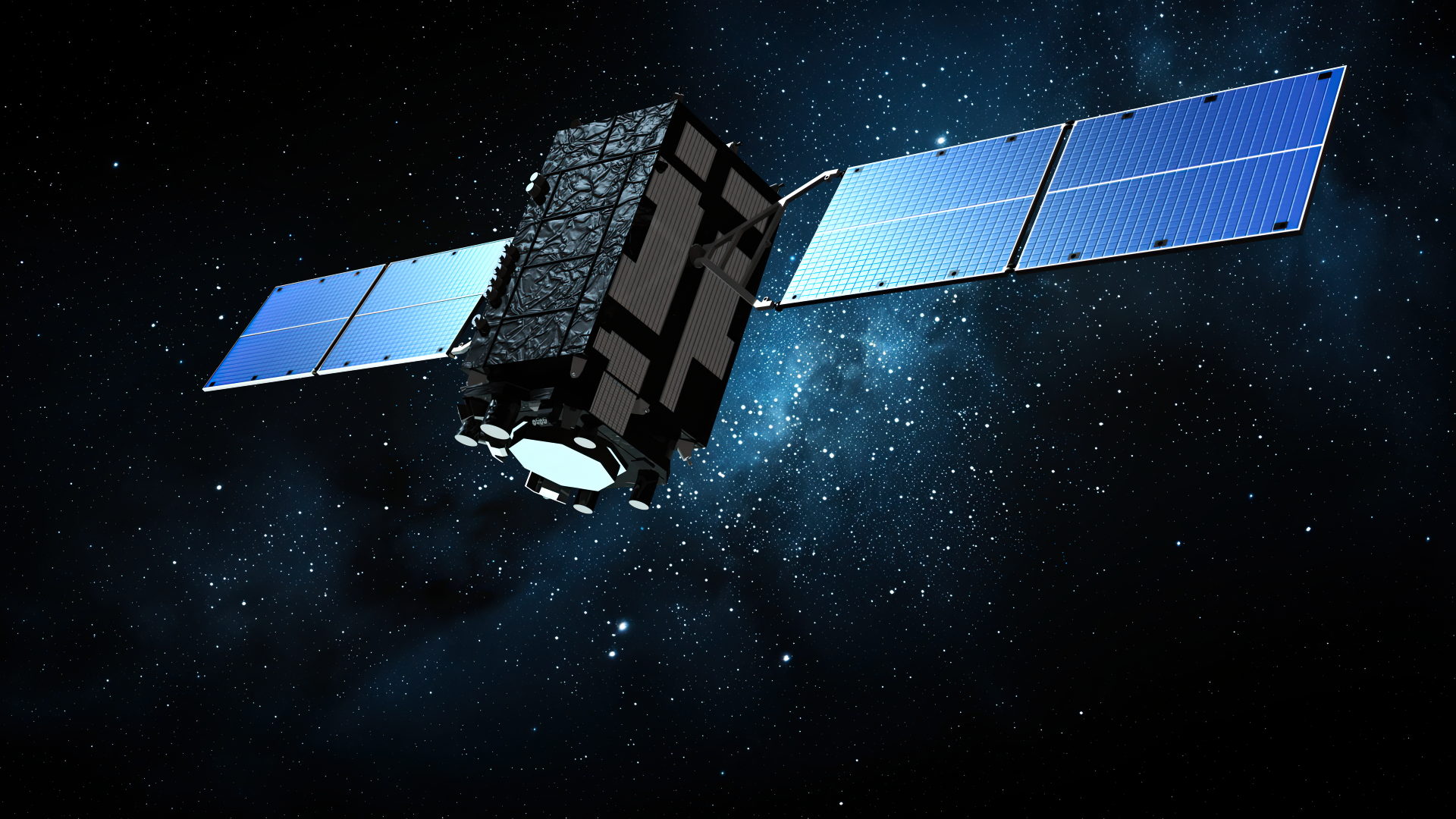
Artist's rendering of the Quasi-Zenith Satellite System's QZS-6 craft in orbit.

Navigation satellite systems are long-running infrastructure programs that provide positioning, navigation, and timing services through constellations of dedicated spacecraft. They include global systems, regional systems, augmentation systems, replacement satellite blocks, and earlier navigation programs that were superseded as satellite navigation matured..

- Global Positioning System
  - GPS Block II – Generations of US navigation satellites
  - GPS Block IIA – Generations of US navigation satellites
  - GPS Block IIF – Operational generation of GPS satellites
  - GPS Block IIR – Generations of US navigation satellites
  - GPS Block III – Current generation of GPS satellites
  - GPS IIR-1 – First of new class of GPS satellite, destroyed soon after launch in January 1997
  - Navstar 7 – Failed American navigation satellite
  - Wide Area GPS Enhancement
- GLONASS
  - GLONASS (first-generation satellites)
  - GLONASS-K2 – Russian navigation satellite
  - History of GLONASS
- Galileo
  - GIOVE – European Space Agency satellites
- BeiDou
  - Compass-G1 – Chinese navigation satellite
  - Compass-IGSO1 – Chinese navigation satellite
- Indian Regional Navigation Satellite System
  - IRNSS-1A – Indian navigation satellite
  - IRNSS-1B – Indian navigation satellite
  - IRNSS-1C – Indian navigation satellite
  - IRNSS-1D – Indian Earth observation satellite, 2015–2025
  - IRNSS-1E – Indian navigation satellite
  - IRNSS-1F – Indian navigation satellite
  - IRNSS-1G – Indian navigation satellite
  - IRNSS-1H – Indian navigation satellite
  - IRNSS-1I – Indian navigation satellite
  - NVS-01 – Indian navigation satellite
  - NVS-02 – Indian navigation satellite
- Quasi-Zenith Satellite System
  - QZS-1 – Japanese regional navigation satellite system
  - QZS-1R – Japanese navigation satellite
  - QZS-2 – Japanese regional navigation satellite system
  - QZS-3 – Japanese regional navigation satellite system
  - QZS-4 – Japanese regional navigation satellite system
  - QZS-5 – Japanese navigation satellite
  - QZS-6 – Japanese navigation satellite
  - QZS-7 – Japanese regional navigation satellite system
- Defunct navigation systems
  - Nadezhda (satellite)
  - Parus (satellite) – Soviet/Russian communication and navigation satellite constellation
  - Transit 3B – American satellite designed to study geodesy
  - Transit 5E-1 – Artificial satellite of the United States Department of Defense
  - Tsikada

=== Scientific satellite programs ===
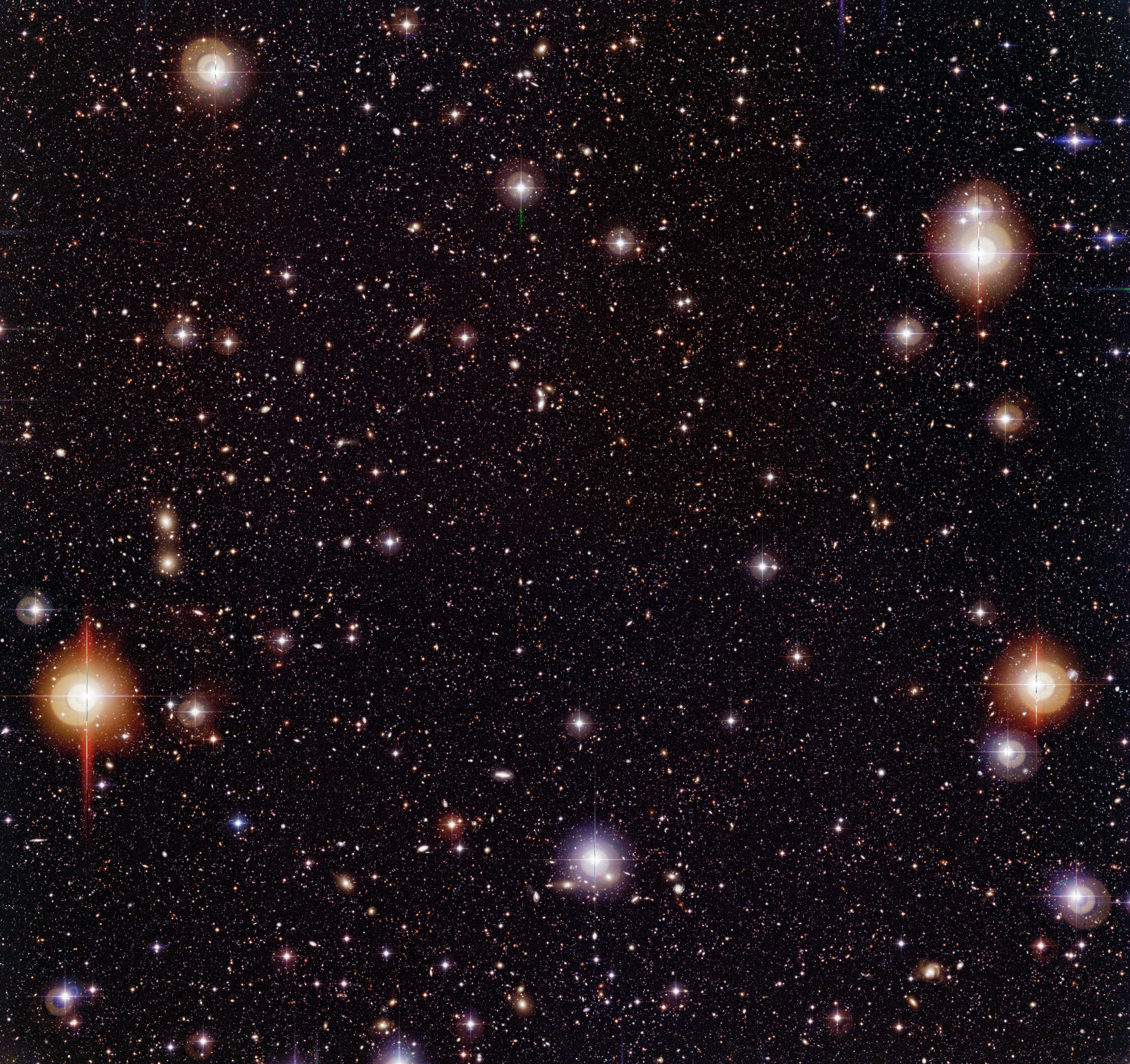
An image of the Chandra Deep Field South in the Fornax constellation, captured by the Chandra X-ray Observatory. Chandra gives a distance estimate of about 11.9 to 12.9 billion light-years for the distant galaxies studied in this field.

Scientific satellite programs use space-based observatories and instrumented spacecraft to make measurements that are blocked, blurred, or otherwise limited from the ground. They include mission lines, observatory families, instruments, science centers, and servicing programs used to study the universe, the cosmic microwave background, the heliosphere, and the space environment.

  - Chandra X-ray Observatory
    - Chandra X-ray Observatory – NASA space telescope launched in 1999
      - Advanced CCD Imaging Spectrometer
      - Chandra Deep Field South – Astronomical survey in Fornax
      - High Resolution Camera
  - Cosmic Background Explorer
    - COBE Differential Microwave Radiometer
    - Cosmic Background Explorer – NASA satellite of the Explorer program
    - Diffuse Infrared Background Experiment
    - Far Infrared Absolute Spectrophotometer
  - Explorer program
    - Cosmic Background Explorer – NASA satellite of the Explorer program
    - Explorer 1 – First satellite launched by the United States (1958)
    - Explorers Program – Ongoing NASA space exploration program
    - International Sun-Earth Explorer – NASA satellite of the Explorer program
    - Interplanetary Monitoring Platform – NASA program to investigate interplanetary plasma and magnetic field
    - Interstellar Boundary Explorer – NASA satellite of the Explorer program
    - Wilkinson Microwave Anisotropy Probe – NASA satellite of the Explorer program
  - Great Observatories program
    - Chandra X-ray Observatory – NASA space telescope launched in 1999
    - Compton Gamma Ray Observatory – NASA space observatory designed to detect X-rays and gamma rays (1991–2000)
    - Great Observatories program – Series of NASA satellites
    - Hubble Space Telescope – NASA/ESA space telescope launched in 1990
    - Spitzer Space Telescope – NASA infrared space telescope (2003–2020)
  - Hubble Space Telescope
    - Advanced Camera for Surveys – Installed on HST March 2002
    - Cosmic Origins Spectrograph – Instrument installed on the Hubble Space Telescope
    - Hubble Space Telescope servicing missions
    - Space Telescope Science Institute – Science operations center operated by NASA
    - Wide Field Camera 3 – Astronomical camera on the Hubble Space Telescope
  - Planck spacecraft
    - European Space Agency – European organisation dedicated to space exploration
    - Planck (spacecraft) – Space observatory
  - Spitzer Space Telescope
    - Infrared Array Camera
    - Multiband Imaging Photometer for Spitzer – NASA infrared space telescope (2003–2020)
    - Spitzer Science Center – Private university in Pasadena, California
  - Wilkinson Microwave Anisotropy Probe
    - Cosmic Background Explorer – NASA satellite of the Explorer program
    - Planck (spacecraft) – Space observatory
    - Wilkinson Microwave Anisotropy Probe – NASA satellite of the Explorer program

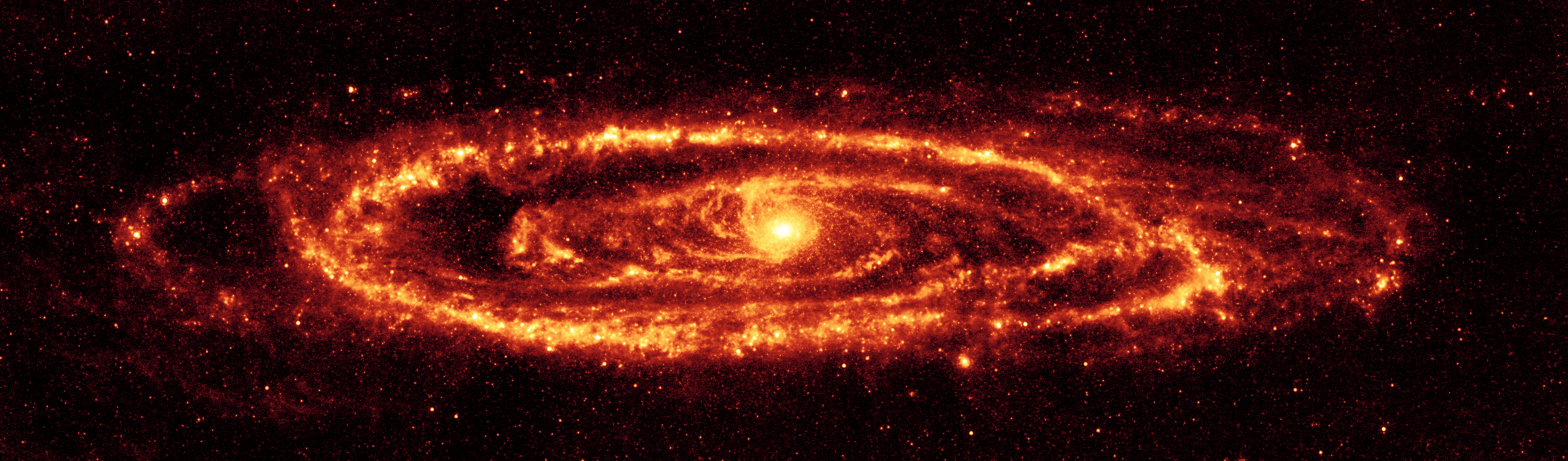
The Andromeda Galaxy imaged by the Spitzer Space Telescope.

=== Weather satellite series ===
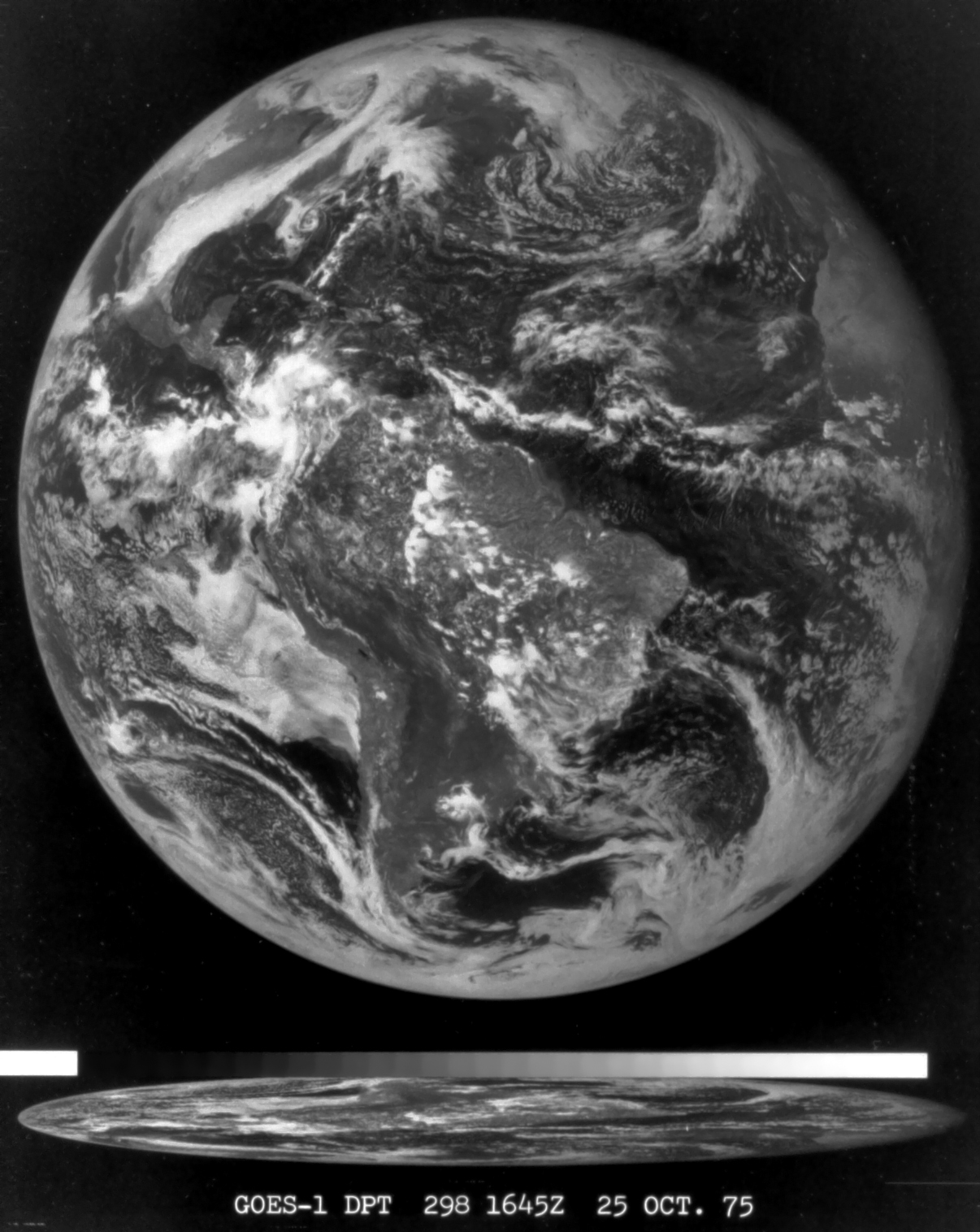
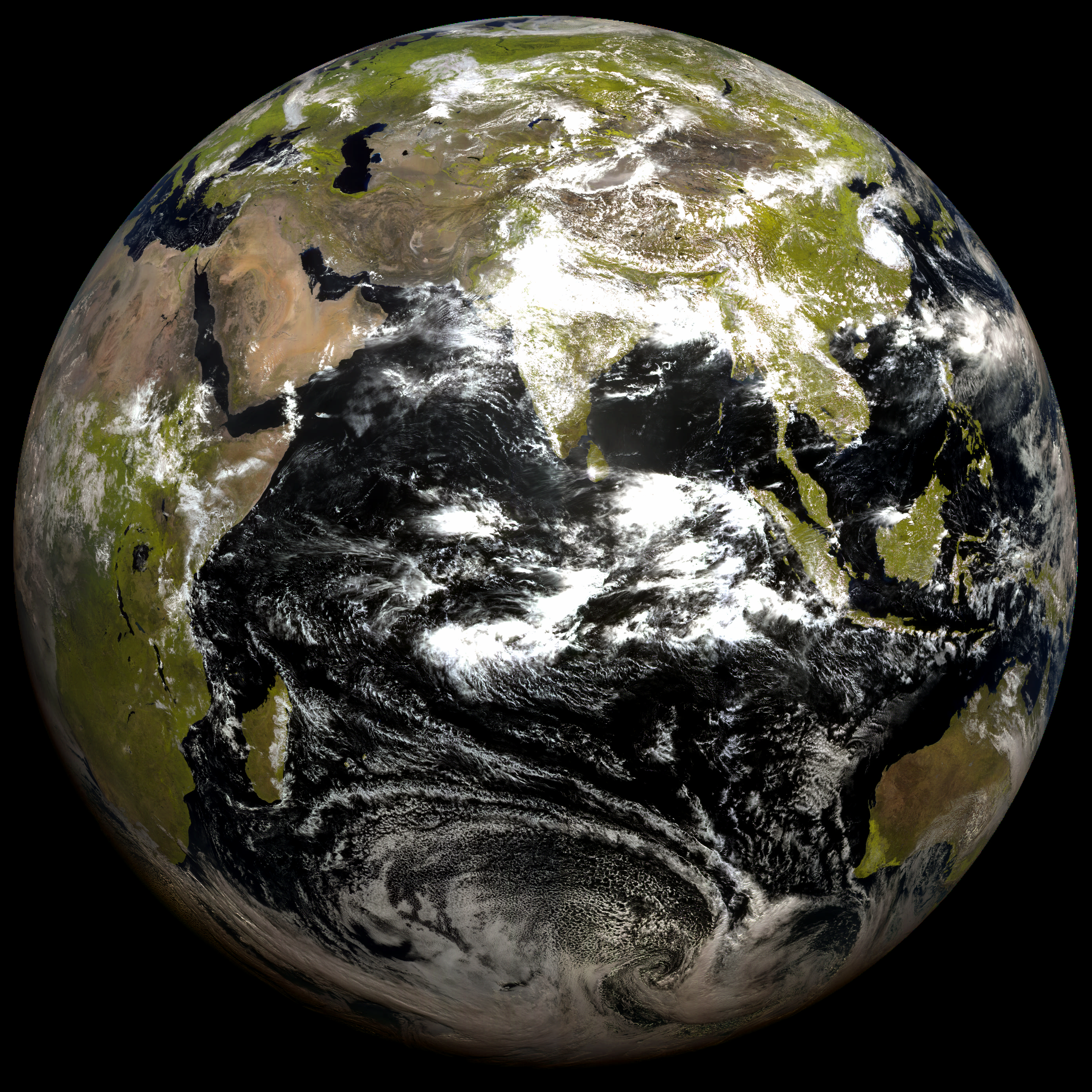
The first image from the GOES-1 satellite in 1975 (black and white). Below, an image of Earth from Elektro-L No.3 in 2025 (color).
- Geostationary Operational Environmental Satellites
  - Geostationary Operational Environmental Satellite – US weather satellite series
    - GOES 13 – U.S. Space Force weather satellite
    - GOES 14 – NOAA weather satellite
    - GOES 15 – US Space Force weather satellite
    - GOES-17 – NOAA weather satellite
    - GOES-18 – NOAA weather satellite
    - List of GOES satellites
- Himawari satellite series
  - Multi-Functional Transport Satellite – Series of weather and aviation control satellites
- Television Infrared Observation Satellites
  - TIROS-2 – Former American weather satellite
  - TIROS-3 – Former American weather satellite
  - TIROS-4 – Former American weather satellite
  - TIROS-5 – Former American weather satellite
  - TIROS-6 – Former American weather satellite
  - TIROS-7 – Former American weather satellite
  - TIROS-8 – Former American weather satellite
  - TIROS-9 – Former American weather satellite
  - TIROS-M – Deactivated weather satellite
- Polar-orbiting Operational Environmental Satellites
  - NOAA-2 – Weather satellite (1972–1975)
  - NOAA-3 – Deactivated weather satellite
  - NOAA-4 – Weather satellite operated by NOAA
  - NOAA-5 – Weather satellite operated by NOAA
  - NOAA-6 – American weather satellite
  - NOAA-7 – Weather satellite (1981–1986)
  - NOAA-8 – Weather satellite
  - NOAA-9 – American weather satellite
  - NOAA-10 – American weather satellite
  - NOAA-11 – American weather satellite (1988–2004)
  - NOAA-12 – American weather satellite (1991–2007)
  - NOAA-14 – American weather satellite (1994–2007)
  - NOAA-15 – American weather satellite (1998–2025)
  - NOAA-16 – American weather satellite (2000–2014)
  - NOAA-17 – American weather satellite (2002–2013)
  - NOAA-18 – American weather satellite (2005–2025)
- Meteor satellites
  - Meteor-1 1
  - Meteor-3M No.1 – Weather satellite
  - Meteor-M No.1 – Russian weather satellite (2009–2014)
  - Meteor-M No.2 – Russian weather satellite
  - Meteor-M No.2-1 – Russian space satellite
  - Meteor-M No.2-2
- Other weather satellite series
  - Elektro–L – Russian meteorological satellites

== Satellite systems ==
A satellite system connects an operating spacecraft with the ground infrastructure, users, radio links, and control processes needed to run the mission and deliver useful data or services. Its major parts include the ground segment, space segment, payloads, and tracking, telemetry, and command functions that connect the spacecraft to operators and end users.

=== Ground segment ===
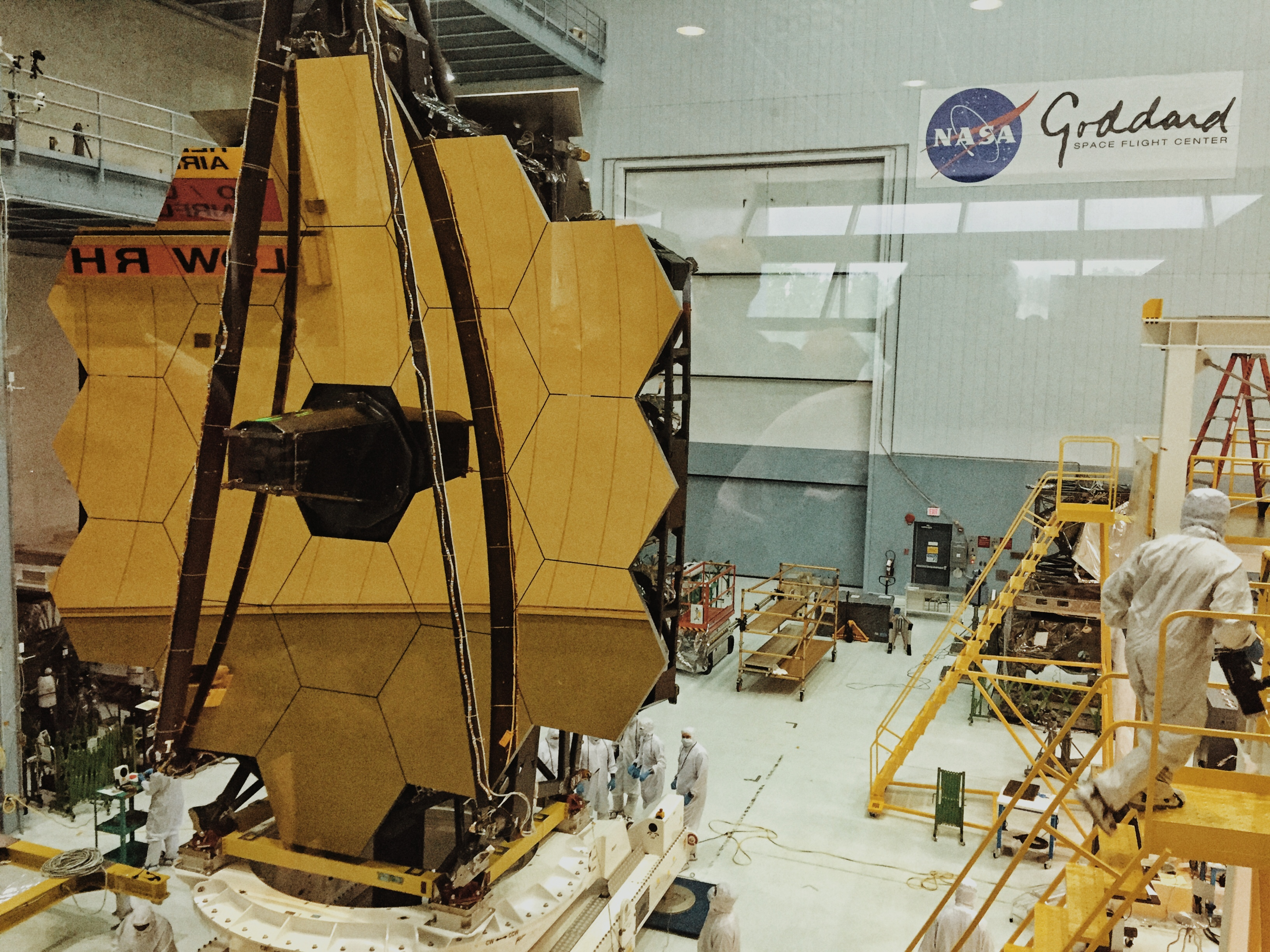
James Webb Space Telescope mirrors assembled at Goddard Space Flight Center, May 2016.

The ground segment is the Earth-based part of a satellite mission, linking spacecraft operations to command uplinks, telemetry reception, payload-data delivery, calibration, validation, and user access. It includes ground stations, mission control centers, control networks, processing centers, teleports, and user terminals.

- Calibration and validation sites
  - EUREF Permanent Network
  - Ground sample distance – Distance between pixel centers in remote sensing
  - Ground truth – Information provided by direct observation
  - Lincoln Calibration Sphere 1 – Radar calibration satellite
  - On-The-Fly Calibration
  - Sfera (calibration satellite) – Small passive satellite deployed during a spacewalk from the ISS in August 2012
- Data processing centers
  - Goddard Space Flight Center – NASA research facility in Maryland
  - Jet Propulsion Laboratory – NASA federally funded research and development center
- Ground stations
  - Antenna tracking system
  - Controlled reception pattern antenna – Active antennas that are designed to resist radio jamming
  - Tracking and Data Relay Satellite System – Network of American communications satellites
  - Tracking and data relay satellite – American communications satellite
- Mission control centers
  - European Space Operations Centre – Main mission control centre for the European Space Agency
  - Goddard Space Flight Center – NASA research facility in Maryland
  - Jet Propulsion Laboratory – NASA federally funded research and development center
  - Space Operations Command – U.S. Space Force command
- Satellite control networks
  - ACTS Gigabit Satellite Network – Prototype communications system
  - Tracking and Data Relay Satellite System – Network of American communications satellites
- Teleports
  - Broadband Global Area Network – Global satellite network
  - Inmarsat – British satellite communications company
- User terminals
  - Controlled reception pattern antenna – Active antennas that are designed to resist radio jamming
  - Globalstar – Global satellite telecommunications company
  - Inmarsat – British satellite communications company
  - Iridium Communications – American satellite communications company

=== Payloads ===
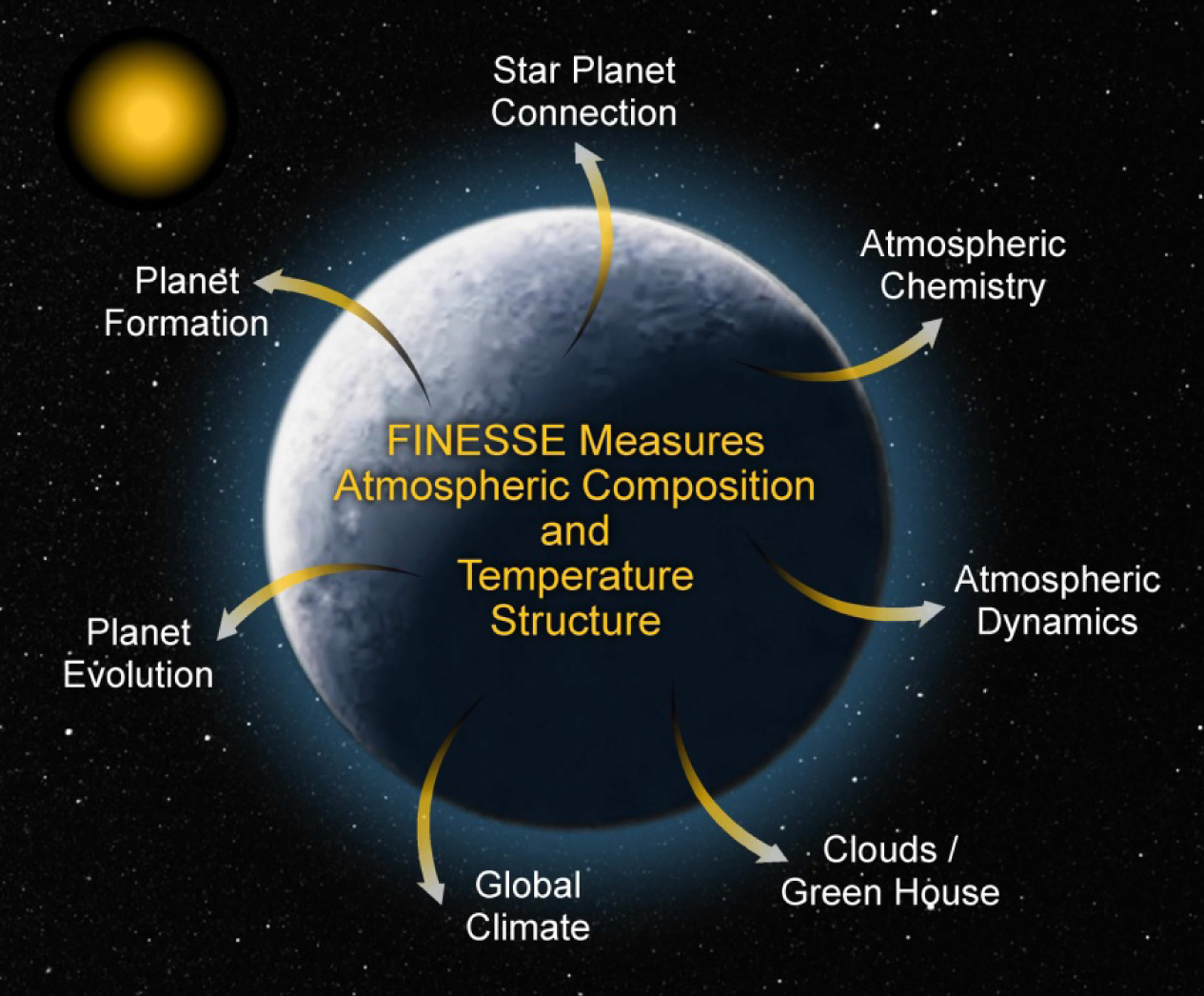
FINESSE would provide uniquely detailed atmospheric information on exoplanets.

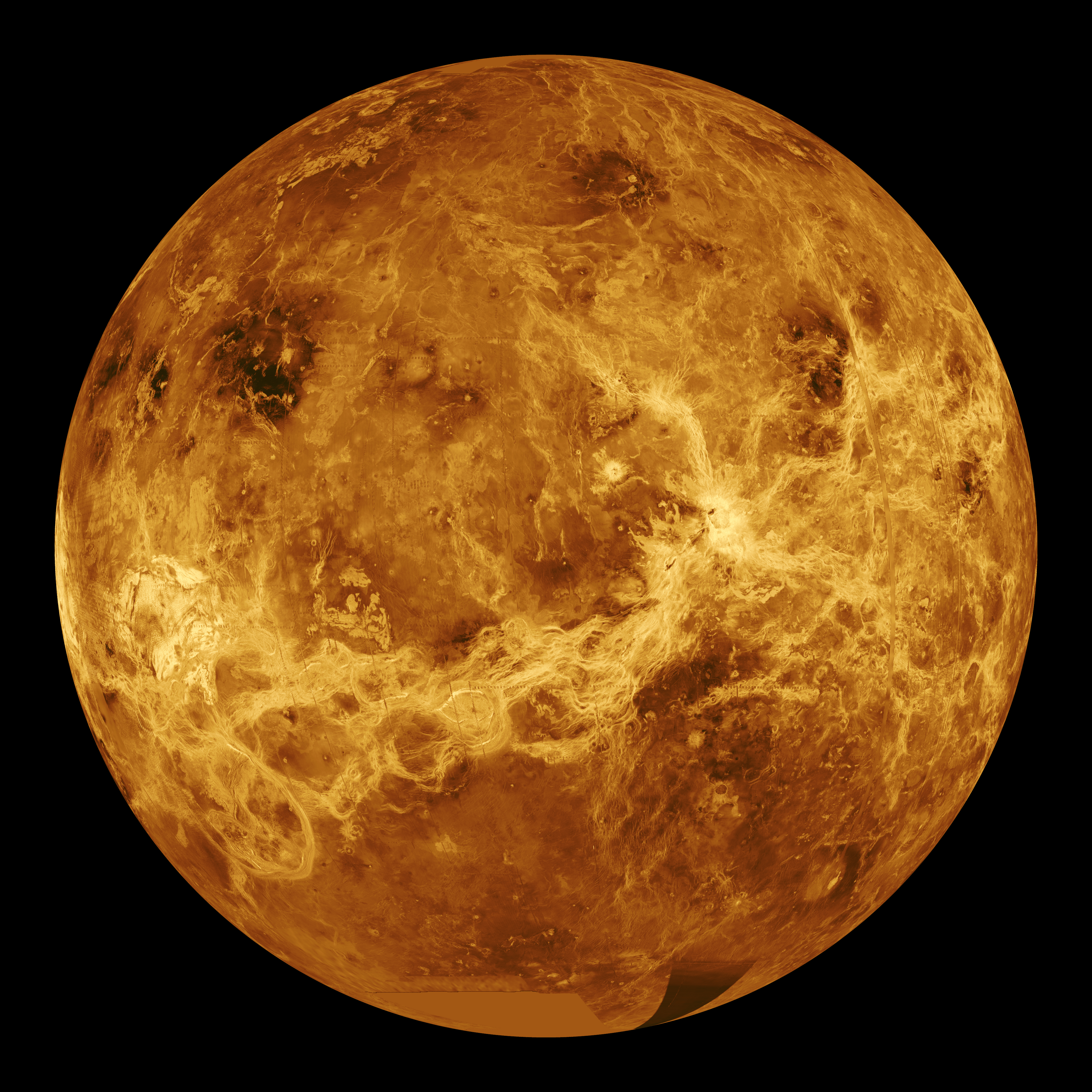
The surface of Venus, as imaged by the Magellan probe using synthetic-aperture radar, colorized with false color.

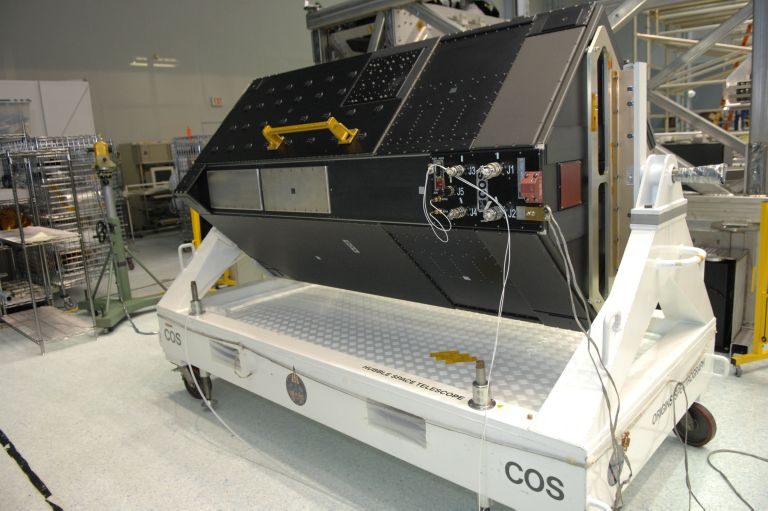
The Cosmic Origins Spectrograph on its handling cart in the Spacecraft Systems Development Facility cleanroom at the Goddard Space Flight Center.

A satellite payload is the mission equipment carried to perform the satellite's useful work, distinct from the spacecraft bus that supports it. Payloads may observe, measure, relay, navigate, time, image, or sense using instruments such as cameras, radar, radiometers, sounders, spectrometers, magnetometers, particle detectors, transponders, and clocks.

- Altimeters
  - Electrostatic Gravity Gradiometer – ESA satellite to map Earth's gravity field
  - Jason satellite series – Series of Earth observation satellites
  - Ka-band Radar Interferometer – NASA/CNES oceanography mission (2022–present)
  - Radar for Europa Assessment and Sounding: Ocean to Near-surface – Ice-penetrating radar for Europa Clipper
  - TOPEX/Poseidon – Satellite mission to map ocean surface topography
- Communications payloads
  - Hosted payload
  - Laser Interconnect and Networking Communication System – Laser communication in space test cubesats
  - Tracking and Data Relay Satellite System – Network of American communications satellites
  - Transponder (satellite communications) – Device or series of devices that receive, then transmit (relay) a signal
- Imaging payloads
  - Advanced Camera for Surveys – Installed on HST March 2002
  - Advanced Land Imager – Former Earth Observation Satellite
  - Apollo TV camera – Portable TV camera suitable for space operations
  - Array of Low Energy X-ray Imaging Sensors – Decommissioned American X-ray telescope
  - Earth Polychromatic Imaging Camera – American solar research spacecraft
  - Faint Object Camera – Installed on HST from 1990 to 2002
  - Geostationary Ocean Color Imager
  - High Resolution Coronal Imager – Suborbital solar telescope
  - Hyperspectral Imager for the Coastal Ocean – Observation sensor on the International Space Station
  - Meteosat visible and infrared imager
  - Multi-Angle Imager for Aerosols
  - Optical Sensor Assembly – Commercial Earth observation satellite
  - Solar X-ray Imager
  - Wide Field Camera 3 – Astronomical camera on the Hubble Space Telescope
- Infrared payloads
  - Advanced Spaceborne Thermal Emission and Reflection Radiometer – Japanese imaging device aboard NASA's Terra satellite
  - Advanced Very-High-Resolution Radiometer – Space-borne earth reflectance sensor
  - Atmospheric infrared sounder – Science instrument on NASA's Aqua satellite
  - Far-infrared Outgoing Radiation Understanding and Monitoring – Future ESA satellite to study Earth's radiation budget
  - Fast Infrared Exoplanet Spectroscopy Survey Explorer – Proposed space telescope
  - Infrared atmospheric sounding interferometer
  - Moderate Resolution Imaging Spectroradiometer – Payload imaging sensor
  - Near Infrared Camera and Multi-Object Spectrometer
  - Special Sensor Ultraviolet Limb Imager
  - Visible Infrared Imaging Radiometer Suite – Spacecraft instrument
- Magnetometers
  - Europa Clipper Magnetometer – Europa Clipper's magnetometer instrument
  - Magnetometer (Juno) – Scientific instrument on the Juno space probe
- Navigation payloads
  - Cyclone Global Navigation Satellite System – American weather satellite system
  - GPS timing – Clock which synchronizes its time using radio transmitters
  - Precise Point Positioning – GPS data processing technique
- Particle detectors
  - CubeSat for Solar Particles – Nanosatellite
  - Dark Matter Particle Explorer – Chinese science satellite
  - Particle Astrophysics Magnet Facility
  - Solar Anomalous and Magnetospheric Particle Explorer – NASA satellite of the Explorer program
- Radiometers
  - Automatic picture transmission – Weather image transmission system
  - Electrically scanning microwave radiometer – Instrument carried by the Nimbus 5 & 6 satellites
  - Microwave Imaging Radiometer with Aperture Synthesis
  - Radiometer Assessment using Vertically Aligned Nanotubes
  - Scanning multichannel microwave radiometer
  - Special sensor microwave/imager
  - Weather System Follow-on Microwave Program – American meteorology satellite
- Radar payloads
  - CloudSat – NASA Earth observation satellite
  - Global Precipitation Measurement – Joint mission between JAXA and NASA
  - JERS-1
  - Ka-band Radar Interferometer – NASA/CNES oceanography mission (2022–present)
  - NISAR (satellite) – Joint NASA-ISRO synthetic radar aperture spacecraft
  - Scatterometer – Meteorological instrumentation
  - Seasat – American ocean observation satellite (1978)
  - SeaWinds – Earth observation satellite
  - Synthetic-aperture radar – Form of radar used to create images of landscapes
  - Tropical Rainfall Measuring Mission – Joint space mission between NASA and JAXA
- Scientific instruments
  - Alice (spacecraft instrument) – Ultraviolet imaging spectrometer aboard New Horizons and Rosetta
  - Aquarius (SAC-D instrument) – NASA instrument aboard the Argentine SAC-D spacecraft
  - Atmosphere-Space Interactions Monitor – ISS-based upper-atmospheric lightning observation project
  - Fine Guidance Sensor (HST) – Hubble Space Telescope instrument system
  - Global Ecosystem Dynamics Investigation – Scientific space mission
  - High Speed Photometer – Scientific instrument on the Hubble Space Telescope
- Sounders
  - Advanced microwave sounding unit – Instrument installed on meteorological satellites
  - Advanced Technology Microwave Sounder
  - High-resolution dynamics limb sounder
  - Infrared atmospheric sounding interferometer
  - Microwave humidity sounder
  - Microwave limb sounder – Satellite measurement technique
  - Microwave Sounding Unit temperature measurements
  - Microwave sounding unit – Satellite instrument for atmospheric monitoring
- Spectrometers
  - Cosmic Origins Spectrograph – Instrument installed on the Hubble Space Telescope
  - Greenhouse Gases Observing Satellite – Japanese Earth observation satellite
  - Greenhouse Gases Observing Satellite-2 – Japanese Earth observation satellite
  - Miniature X-ray Solar Spectrometer CubeSat – NASA satellite
  - Ozone Mapping and Profiler Suite – Instruments to measure ozone distribution
  - Ozone monitoring instrument – Earth observation satellite
  - Total Ozone Mapping Spectrometer
  - Tropospheric Emission Spectrometer
- Timing payloads
  - Deep Space Atomic Clock – Atomic clock used for radio navigation in space
  - GPS timing – Clock which synchronizes its time using radio transmitters
  - Rossi X-ray Timing Explorer – NASA satellite of the Explorer program

=== Space segment ===
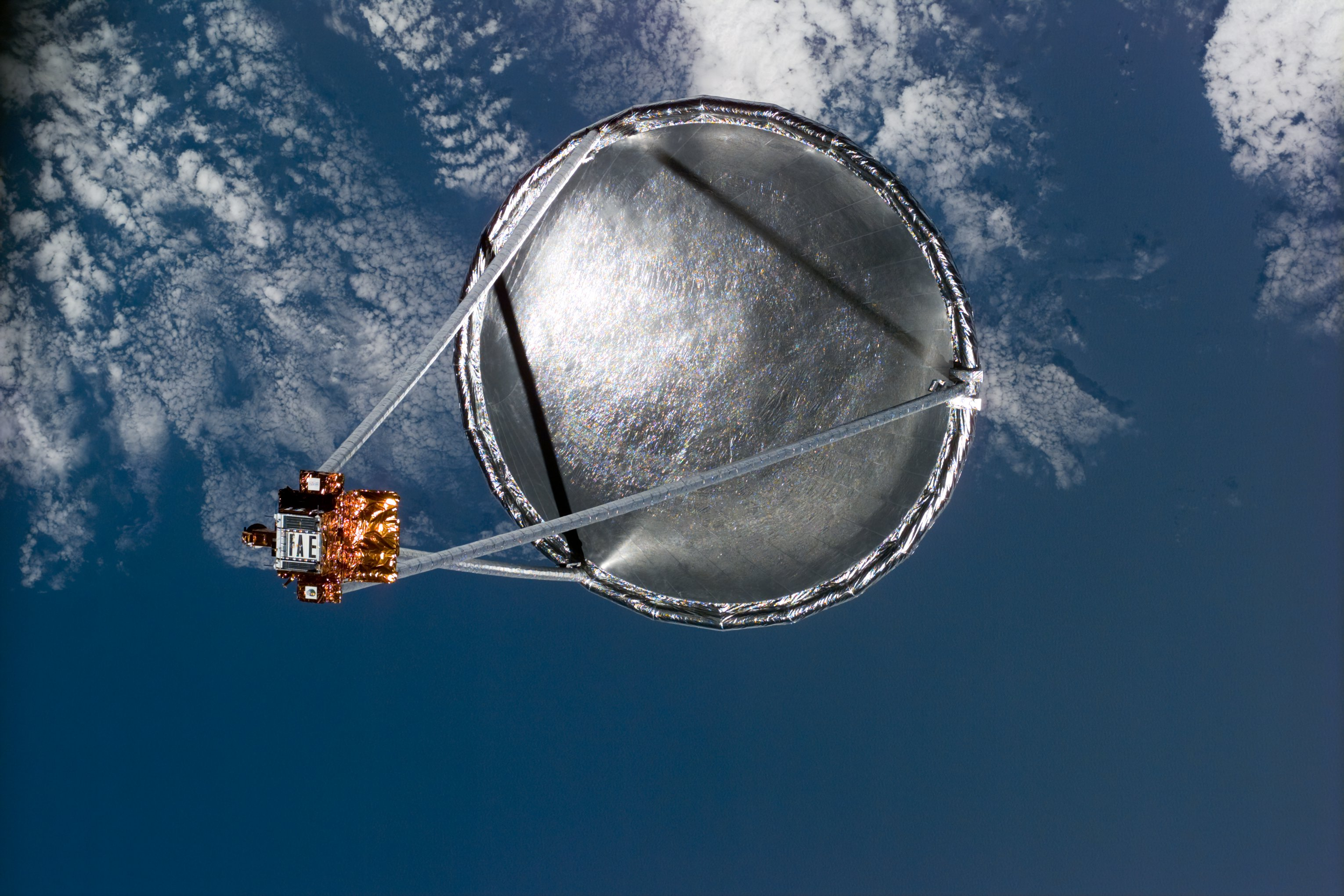
The deployed Inflatable Antenna Experiment.

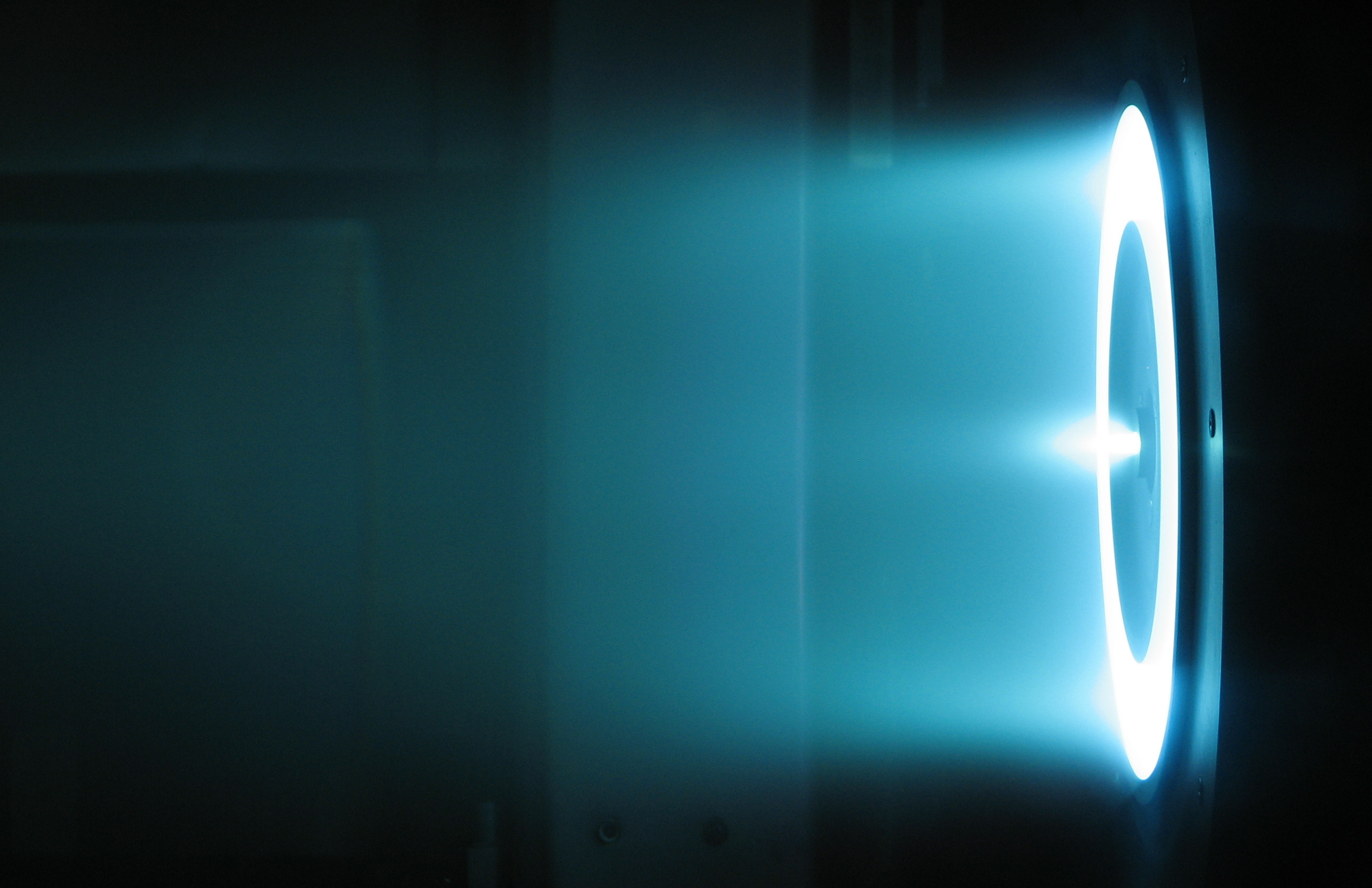
A 6 kW xenon electric propulsion Hall thruster in operation at the NASA Jet Propulsion Laboratory.

The space segment is the orbital part of a satellite system: the spacecraft, its payloads, onboard computers, software, and support subsystems operating in space. It includes the spacecraft bus, power, thermal control, propulsion, communications, command and data handling, fault protection, attitude control, structure, and payload subsystems.

- Attitude determination and control system
  - Control moment gyroscope – Attitude control device
  - Gyroscope – Device for measuring or maintaining orientation
  - Inertial measurement unit – Accelerometer-based navigational device
  - Magnetorquer – Satellite system
  - Reaction wheel – Attitude control device used in spacecraft
  - Spacecraft attitude determination and control – Process of controlling orientation of an aerospace vehicle
  - Star tracker – Type of optical device
- Command and data handling system
  - Comparison of satellite buses
    - Shuttle pallet satellite – Part of NASA's Space Shuttle
  - NASA Standard Spacecraft Computer-I – Component for the MultiMission Modular Spacecraft
- Communications subsystem
  - Antenna tracking system
  - Inflatable Antenna Experiment
  - Transponder (satellite communications) – Device or series of devices that receive, then transmit (relay) a signal
- Fault protection
  - Safe mode (spacecraft) – Uncrewed spacecraft mode
  - Spacecraft attitude determination and control – Process of controlling orientation of an aerospace vehicle
- Onboard computer
  - NASA Standard Spacecraft Computer-I – Component for the MultiMission Modular Spacecraft
  - Spacecraft computer
- Payload subsystem
  - Ariane Passenger Payload Experiment – Communication satellite
  - Hosted payload
- Power system
  - List of nuclear power systems in space
  - Radioisotope thermoelectric generator – Electrical generator that uses heat from radioactive decay
  - Solar panel – Assembly of photovoltaic cells used to generate electricity
  - Space-based solar power – Concept of collecting solar power in outer space and distributing it to Earth
- Propulsion system
  - Cold gas thruster – Type of rocket engine
  - Hall-effect thruster – Type of electric propulsion system
  - Ion thruster – Form of electric spacecraft propulsion
  - Monopropellant rocket – Rocket that uses a single propellant with a catalyst
  - Propellantless propulsion – Spacecraft propulsion without on-board reaction mass
  - Spacecraft electric propulsion – Type of spacecraft propulsion using electrical energy to accelerate propellant
  - Spacecraft propulsion – Method used to accelerate spacecraft
- Spacecraft bus
  - Alphabus – Family of geostationary communications satellites
  - AMOS (satellite bus) – Satellite bus
  - Comparison of satellite buses
  - Eurostar (satellite bus) – Telecommunications satellite platform
  - Eurostar E3000 – Series of satellite bus
  - GEOStar
  - List of Spacebus satellites
  - Modular Common Spacecraft Bus – General purpose spacecraft platform
  - Multi-mission Modular Spacecraft
  - Spacebus – Brand of satellite bus
  - Spacebus 100 – Brand of satellite bus
  - Spacebus 2000 – Brand of satellite bus
  - Spacebus 3000 – Brand of satellite bus
  - Spacebus 4000 – Brand of satellite bus
  - Spacecraft bus – Main body and structural component of the satellite
- Structure
  - Monocoque – Structural design that supports loads through an object's external skin
  - Spacecraft structure – Vehicle or machine designed to fly in space
- Thermal control system
  - Heat pipe – Heat-transfer device that employs phase transition
  - Multi-layer insulation – Thermal insulation using several thin layers
  - Radioisotope thermoelectric generator – Electrical generator that uses heat from radioactive decay
  - Spacecraft thermal control – Process of keeping all parts of a spacecraft within acceptable temperature ranges

=== Tracking, telemetry, and command ===
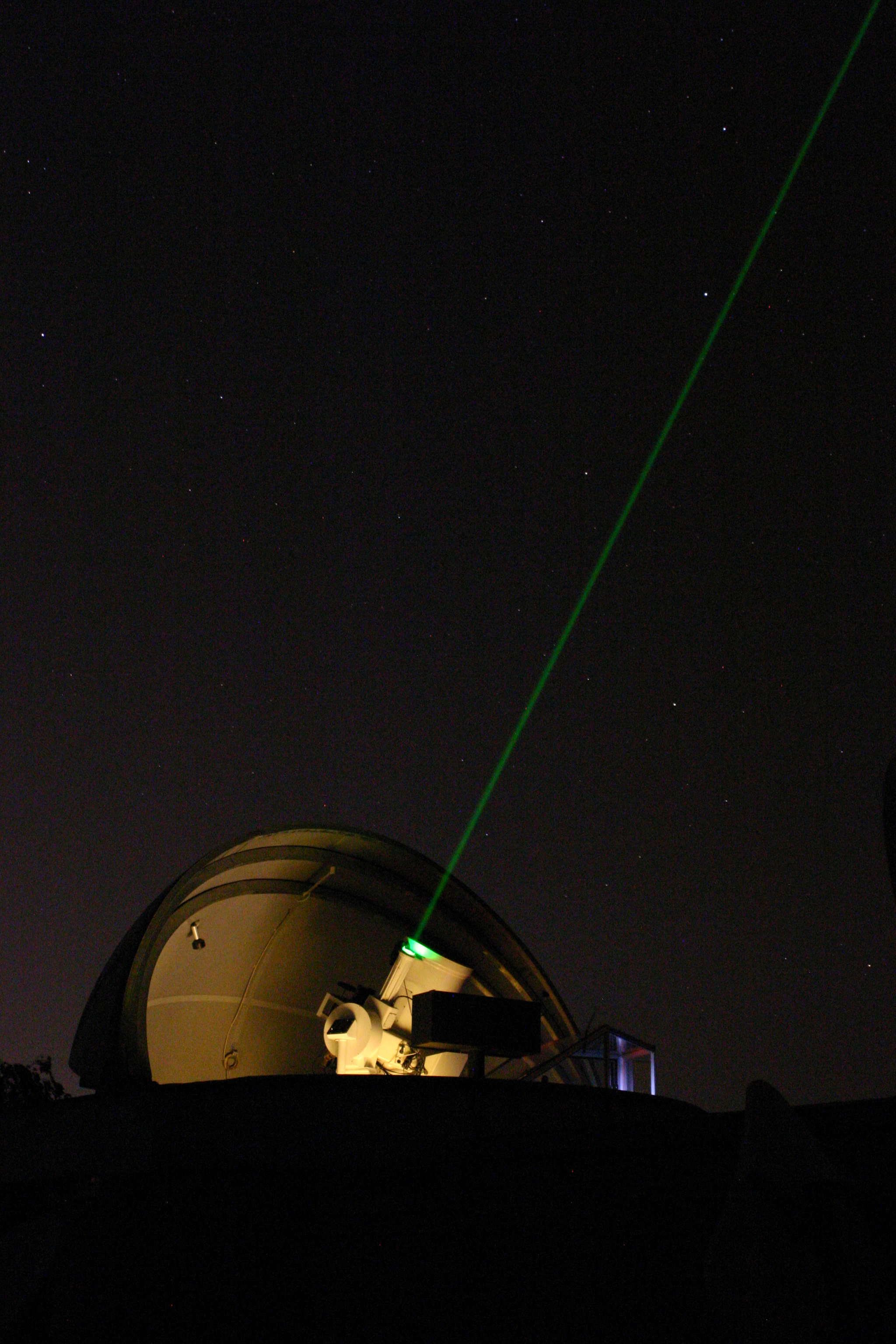
Satellite laser ranging at the Lustbühel Observatory near Graz, Austria.

The spacecraft and ground operators are connected during routine operations and contingencies through tracking, telemetry, commanding, and communications links. Tracking determines spacecraft position, telemetry reports spacecraft health and status, and commanding sends instructions to the satellite, with communications security protecting control and data flows.

- Tracking
  - Antenna tracking system
  - Doppler effect – Frequency change of a wave for observer relative to its source
  - Satellite ground track – Path on the surface of the Earth or another body directly below an aircraft or satellite
  - Satellite laser ranging – Type of satellite laser
- Telemetry and commanding
  - Downlink – Communication channel between two or more devices
  - Link budget – Accounting of signal gains and losses in communications
  - Telecommand – Method of controlling a remote system
  - Telemetry – Automatic collection and transmission of data
  - Transponder (satellite communications) – Device or series of devices that receive, then transmit (relay) a signal
  - Uplink – Communication channel between two or more devices
- Ground infrastructure
  - Consultative Committee for Space Data Systems – Coordinator of data standards for space communication
  - Ground station – Terrestrial radio station for communication with spacecraft
  - Tracking and Data Relay Satellite System – Network of American communications satellites
- Security
  - Authentication – Act of proving an assertion
  - Encryption – Process of converting plaintext to ciphertext

== Space environment, hazards, and security ==
Satellites operate in a contested and hazardous space environment shaped by orbital debris, collision risk, electromagnetic interference, cyber threats, radiation, meteoroids, and military counterspace systems. Major security topics include anti-satellite weapons, space situational awareness, collision avoidance, signal jamming and spoofing, spacecraft hardening, cybersecurity, and debris mitigation.

=== Anti-satellite weapons ===
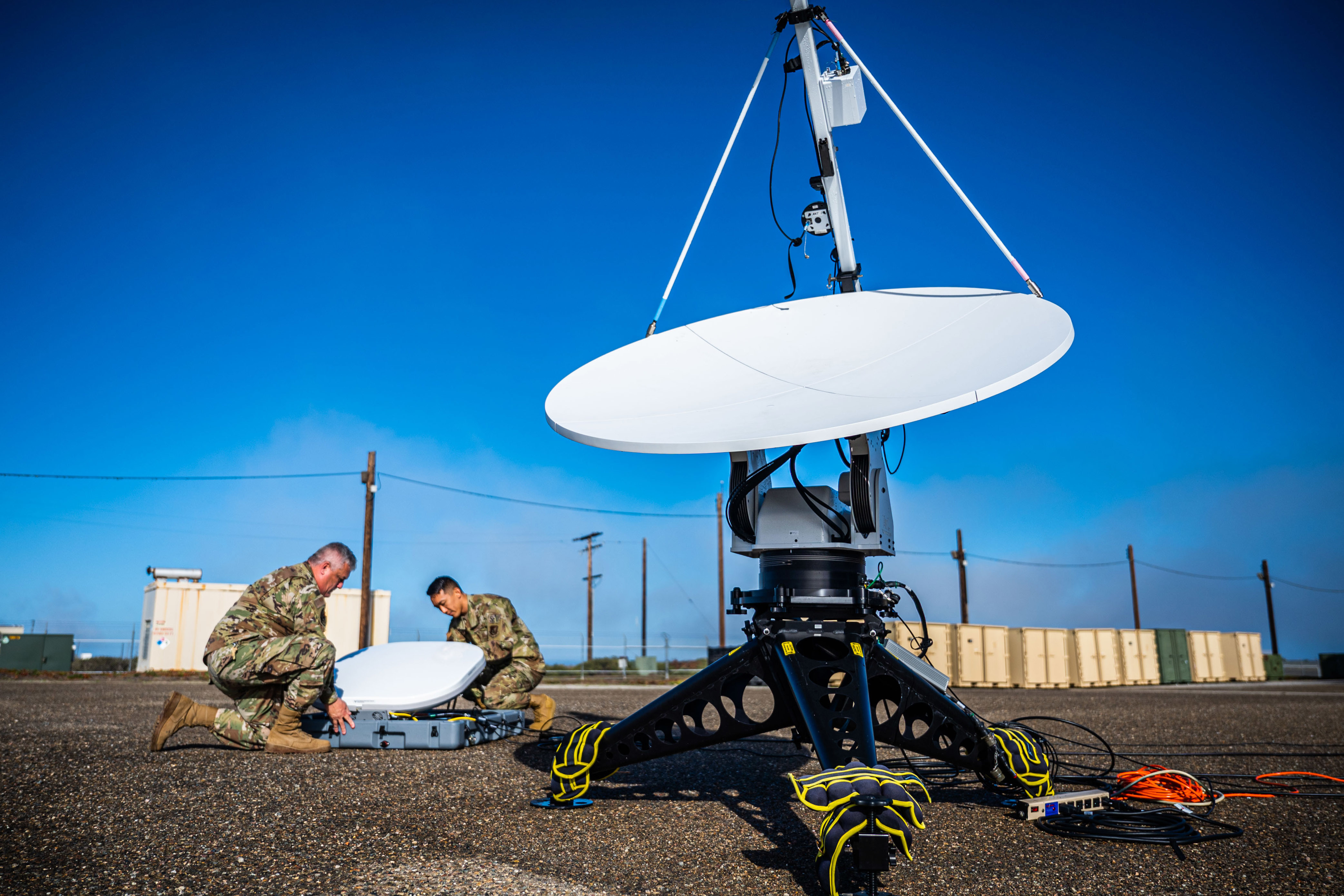
United States Space Force personnel operating a satellite antenna during an electromagnetic warfare military exercise.

Anti-satellite weapons and related counterspace systems are used or developed to disrupt, degrade, damage, or destroy satellites and space services. Major categories include direct-ascent weapons, co-orbital systems, directed-energy weapons, electronic attacks such as jamming or spoofing, and cyberattacks against space systems.

- Co-orbital and directed-energy anti-satellite weapons
  - Directed-energy weapon – Type of weapon that fires a concentrated beam of energy at its target
  - Istrebitel Sputnikov – Soviet anti-satellite weapon program
  - Laser weapon – Directed-energy weapon using lasers
  - Militarisation of space – Use of outer space for military aims
  - Space warfare – Combat that takes place in outer space
  - Space weapon – Weapons used in space warfare
- Direct-ascent anti-satellite weapons
  - 2007 Chinese anti-satellite missile test – Largest field of space debris in history
  - Anti-satellite missile – Kinetic energy device designed to destroy satellites in orbit
  - Anti-satellite weapon – Kinetic energy device designed to destroy satellites in orbit
  - ASM-135 ASAT
  - Kosmos 1408 – Soviet artificial satellite destroyed by an ASAT missile
  - Mission Shakti – First Indian anti-satellite weapon test
  - SC-19
  - USA-193 – U.S. military satellite (2006–2008)
- Electronic anti-satellite attacks
  - Electronic countermeasure – Electronic device for deceiving detection systems
  - Electronic warfare – Combat involving electronics and directed energy
  - GNSS jamming – Radio jamming of satellite navigation signals
  - Radio jamming – Interference with authorized wireless communications

=== Collisions and collision avoidance ===
Satellites, rocket bodies, and orbital debris are tracked to predict close approaches, assess conjunction risk, and support maneuvers that reduce the chance of collision. This area includes collision events, debris-producing events, orbital-debris mitigation, end-of-life disposal, active debris removal, reentry risk, and space situational awareness systems used to monitor objects in orbit.

- Close approaches
  - Collision avoidance (spacecraft) – Form of collision management in aeronautics
  - Satellite Catalog Number – NORAD satellite identifier
- Collision avoidance maneuvers
  - Collision avoidance (spacecraft) – Form of collision management in aeronautics
- Conjunction assessment
  - Collision avoidance (spacecraft) – Form of collision management in aeronautics
  - Satellite Catalog Number – NORAD satellite identifier
- Satellite collisions and debris-producing events
  - 2009 satellite collision – First hypervelocity spacecraft collision
  - 2007 Chinese anti-satellite missile test – Largest field of space debris in history
  - Iridium 33 – Communications satellite operated by Iridium Communications
  - Kosmos 1408 – Soviet artificial satellite destroyed by an ASAT missile
  - Kosmos 2251 – Defunct Russian military communications satellite, operational from 1993 to 1995
  - List of space debris producing events
  - Operation Burnt Frost – 2008 military operation to destroy a non-functioning U.S. satellite
  - Satellite collision – Collision involving one or more satellites in orbit
- Space situational awareness and surveillance
  - Geosynchronous Space Situational Awareness Program – American military space surveillance program
  - Near Earth Object Surveillance Satellite – Microsatellite from Canada
  - Radar Fence Transponder – Amateur radio satellite
  - Satellite Catalog Number – NORAD satellite identifier
  - Space Based Space Surveillance – American military space surveillance program

=== Signal interference, hardening, and cybersecurity ===
Satellite security covers threats to spacecraft, ground systems, radio links, and user equipment, including cyberattack, jamming, spoofing, electromagnetic interference, and the radiation environment. Responses include computer security, radiation hardening, spectrum monitoring, interference reporting, anti-jam and anti-spoofing measures, and other protections that preserve command, communications, navigation, and mission data.

- Cybersecurity
  - Computer security – Protection of computer systems from information disclosure, theft or damage
  - Spoofing attack – Type of cyber attack
- Satellite protection and hardening
  - Radiation hardening – Making devices resist ionizing radiation
  - Space situational awareness – Surveillance from and of the outer space environment
- Satellite jamming and spoofing
  - Electromagnetic interference – Disturbance in an electrical circuit due to external sources of radio waves
  - Electronic counter-countermeasure – Part of electronic warfare
  - GNSS spoofing – Type of spoofing attack
  - Health and environmental effects of satellite signal jamming in Iran
  - Meaconing – Electronic countermeasure
- Spectrum monitoring
  - International Telecommunication Union – Specialized agency of the United Nations
  - Radio spectrum – Electromagnetic spectrum, 3 Hz – 3000 GHz
  - Spectrum management – Regulating the use of radio frequencies to promote efficient use

=== Space debris and related risks ===
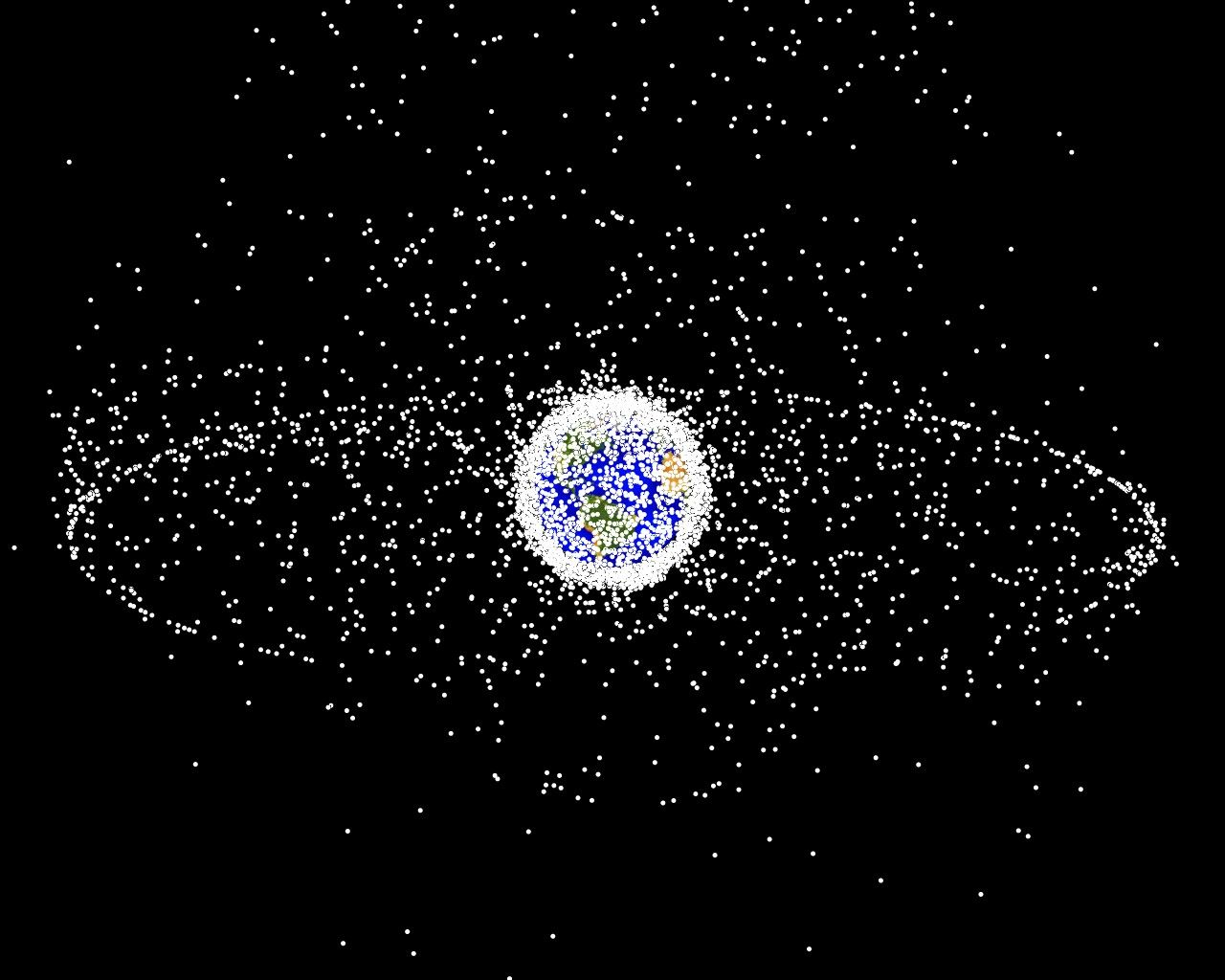
Space debris populations seen from outside geosynchronous orbit (GEO). Note the two primary debris fields, the ring of objects in GEO, and the cloud of objects in low Earth orbit (LEO).

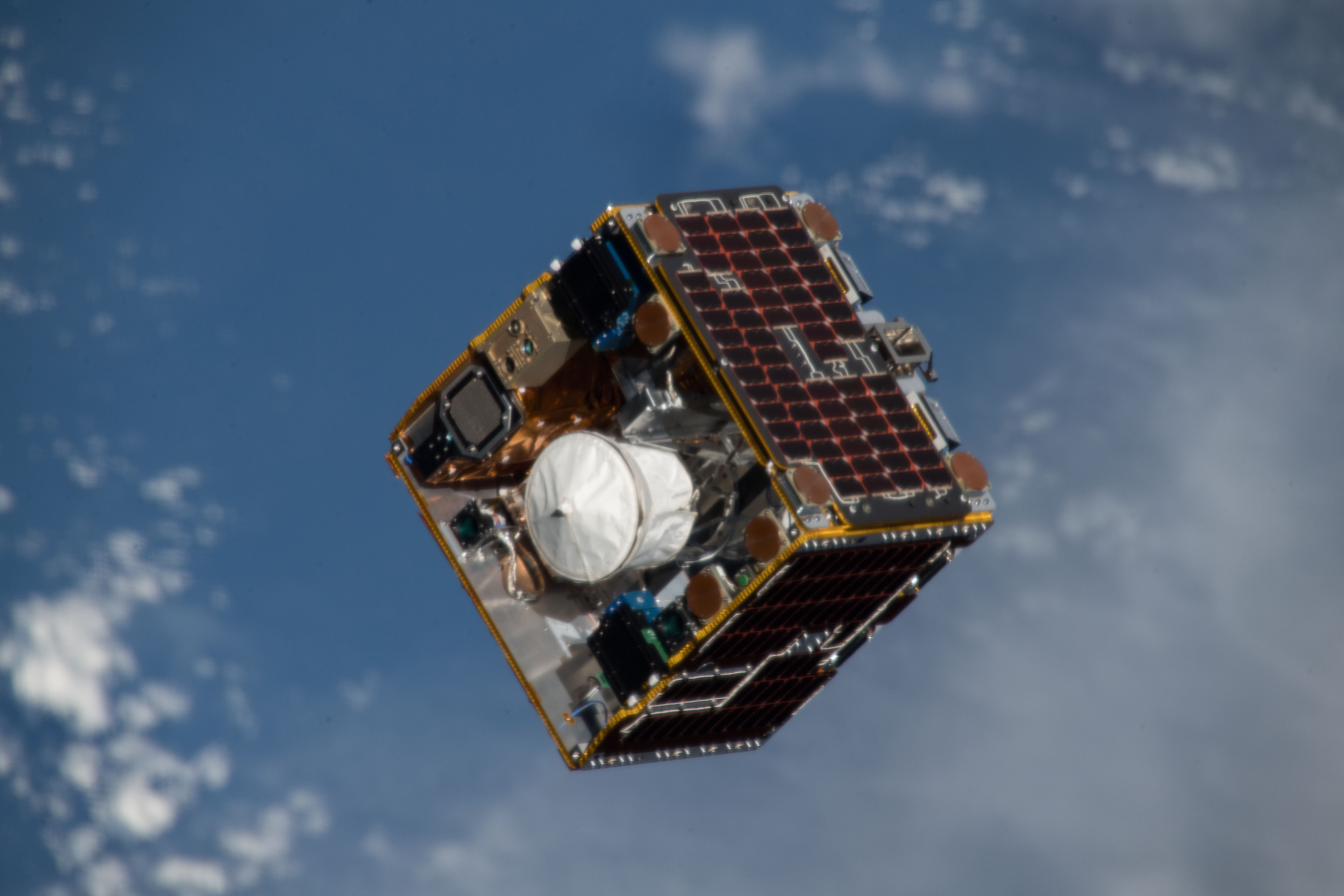
RemoveDEBRIS was a satellite research project intending to demonstrate various space debris removal technologies.

Space debris includes defunct satellites, spent rocket bodies, fragments, and other human-made objects that remain in orbit and can threaten operational spacecraft. Debris work includes tracking and cataloging objects, preventing new debris through mitigation and disposal practices, removing selected objects, managing reentry risk, and studying cascade risks such as Kessler syndrome alongside related particle hazards from micrometeoroids.

- Debris mitigation
  - ClearSpace-1 - Planned European mission to demonstrate space debris removal
  - Deorbit of Mir - Controlled atmospheric entry of Mir over the Pacific
  - Graveyard orbit - Spacecraft end-of-life orbit
  - List of space debris producing events
  - RemoveDEBRIS – Project to demonstrate various space debris removal technologies
- Debris removal
  - ClearSpace-1 – Planned European mission to demonstrate space debris removal
  - RemoveDEBRIS – Project to demonstrate various space debris removal technologies
- Debris tracking
  - List of reentering space debris
  - List of space debris producing events
- Kessler syndrome
  - Fengyun – Chinese weather satellites
  - Iridium 33 – Communications satellite operated by Iridium Communications
  - Kessler syndrome – Theoretical satellite collision cascade
  - Kosmos 954 – Reconnaissance satellite of Soviet Union
  - List of space debris producing events
- Micrometeoroids
  - Meteoroid – Sand- to boulder-sized particle of debris in the Solar System
  - Micrometeoroid – Meteoroid with a mass of less than one gram
- Orbital debris
  - Fengyun – Chinese weather satellites
  - Graveyard orbit – Spacecraft end-of-life orbit
  - Kosmos 954 – Reconnaissance satellite of Soviet Union
  - List of reentering space debris
  - List of space debris producing events
  - Space debris – Pollution around Earth by defunct artificial objects

== Lists of satellites ==
=== General lists ===
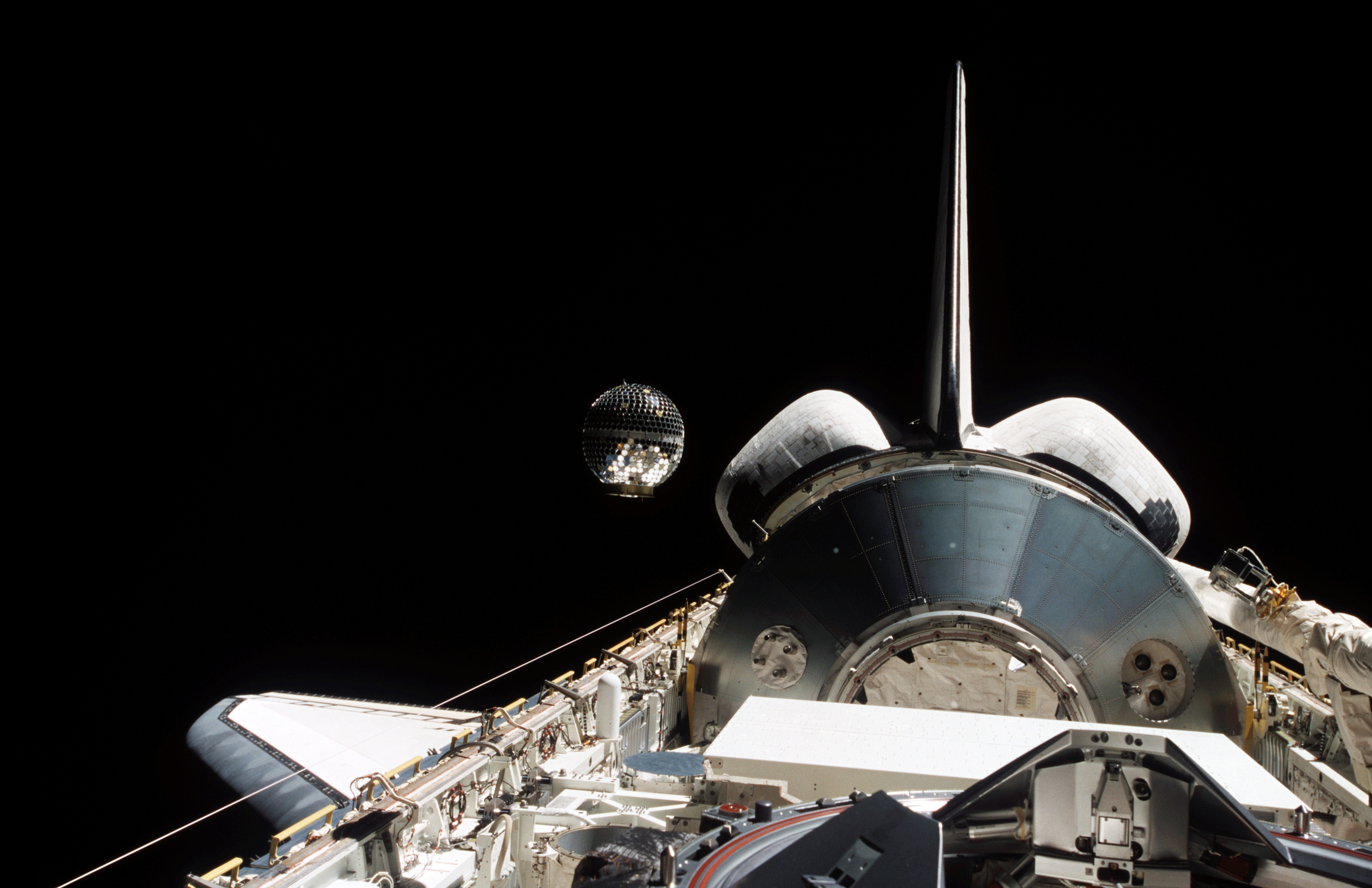
STARSHINE deployed from Endeavour during STS-108 in 2001.

- Category:Lists of satellites
  - List of artificial objects in heliocentric orbit
  - List of extraterrestrial orbiters
  - List of first satellites by country – First artificial satellites launched by country or territory
  - List of natural satellites
  - List of passive satellites
- Satellite constellation – Group of artificial satellites working together as a system

==== Satellites by country ====
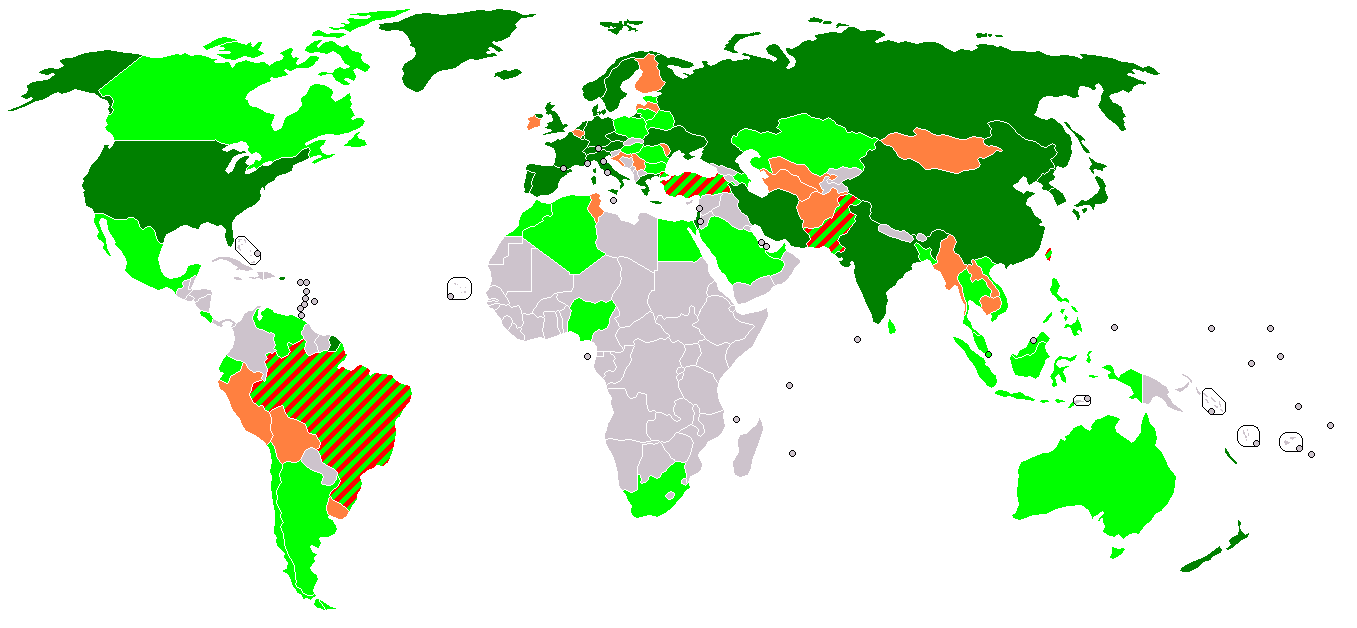
Orbital launch and satellite operation Satellite operation, launched by foreign supplier Satellite in development Orbital launch project at advanced stage or indigenous ballistic missiles deployed

==== First satellites by country ====
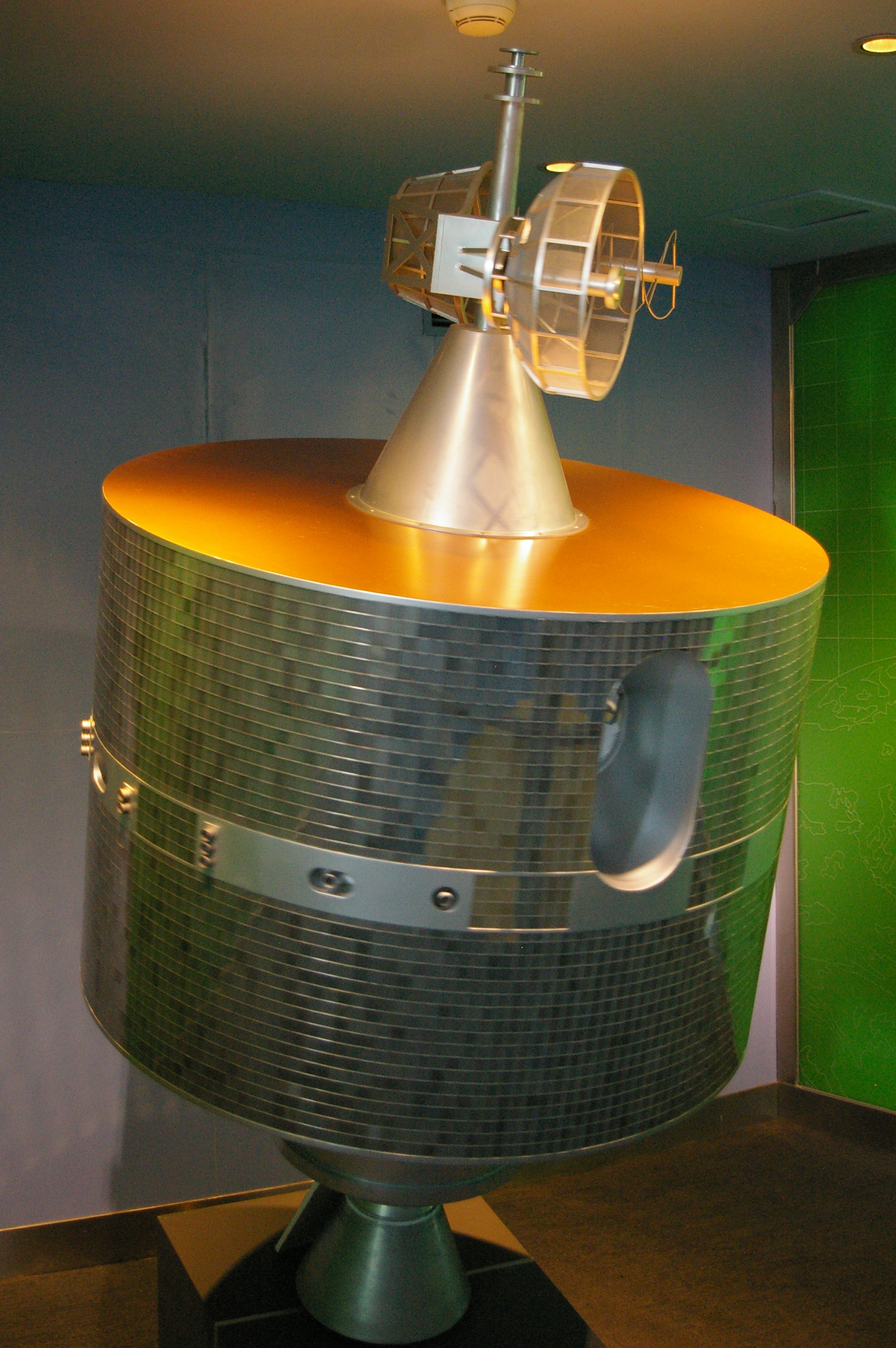
Model of a Fengyun 2 meteorological satellite in the Shanghai Science and Technology Museum.

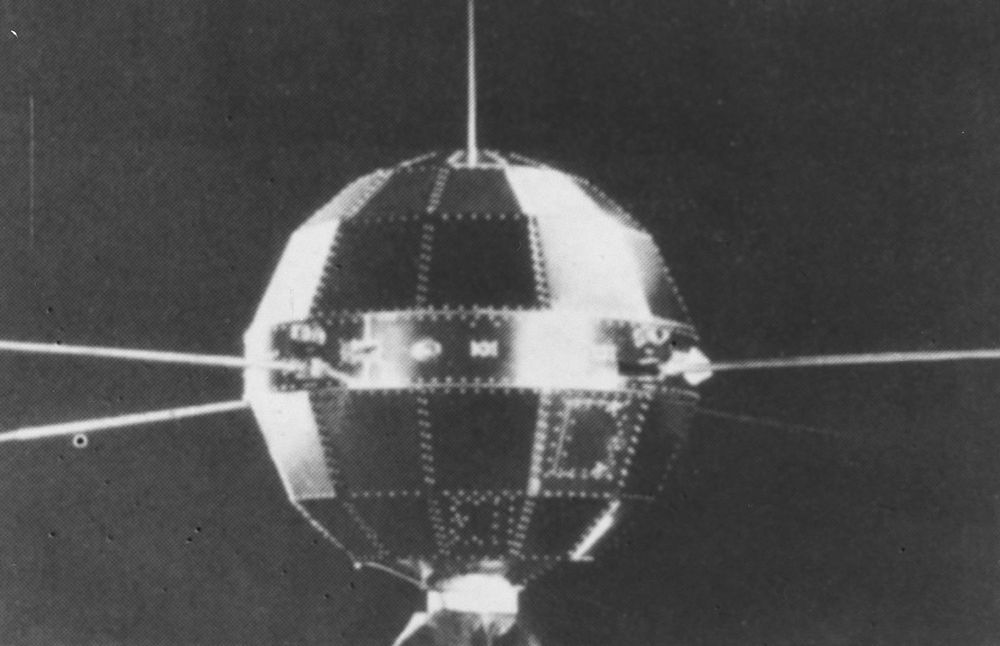
Dong Fang Hong 2 was China's first satellite.

- First artificial satellite by country
  - 1KUNS-PF – Kenyan owned satellite
  - Alcomsat-1 – Algerian communications satellite
  - Alouette 1 – First Canadian satellite
  - Ariel 1 – First British satellite
  - Aryabhata (satellite) – India's first satellite in space (1975–1981)
  - Astérix (satellite) – First French satellite
  - Bangladesh Satellite-1 – First Bangladeshi geostationary communications satellite
  - BHUTAN-1 – First Bhutanese nanosatellite
  - Dong Fang Hong 1 – First satellite launched by China in 1970
  - EgyptSat 1 – Egyptian space satellite
  - ETRSS-1 – Ethiopian satellite
  - Explorer 1 – First satellite launched by the United States (1958)
  - FASat-Alfa
  - GhanaSat-1 – First ghanaian spacecraft
  - KITSAT-1 – First South Korean satellite
  - List of first satellites by country – First artificial satellites launched by country or territory
  - Ofeq – Israeli reconnaissance satellites
  - Ohsumi (satellite) – First Japanese satellite put into orbit, launched in 1970
  - Omid – Iranian communications satellite
  - Prospero (spacecraft) – British experimental satellite launched in 1971
  - San Marco 1 – First Italian satellite
  - Sputnik 1 – First artificial Earth satellite
  - SUNSAT – South African amateur radio satellite
  - THEOS (satellite) – Thai Earth observation satellite
  - Timeline of artificial satellites and space probes
  - WRESAT – First Australian satellite
- First domestic satellite programs
  - Ariel programme – Early British satellite research programme
  - China–Brazil Earth Resources Satellite program – Satellite cooperation program between China and Brazil
  - Dongfanghong program – Satellite program of the People's Republic of China
  - Explorers Program – Ongoing NASA space exploration program
  - Fengyun – Chinese weather satellites
  - Indian National Satellite System – Series of multipurpose geo-stationary satellites launched by ISRO
  - Indian Remote Sensing Programme – Series of Earth observation satellites
  - Kosmos (satellite) – Series of Soviet and Russian military satellites
  - Kwangmyŏngsŏng program – North Korean satellite program
  - Landsat program – American network of Earth-observing satellites for international research purposes
  - Luna programme – Robotic spacecraft missions to the Moon by the Soviet Union (1958–1976)
  - Meteor (satellite) – Series of weather observation satellites launched by Russia
  - Nimbus program – Second-generation U.S. robotic spacecraft
  - Ofeq – Israeli reconnaissance satellites
  - Palapa – Indonesian geostationary communications satellites
  - Project Vanguard – U.S. Navy satellite program in the 1950s
  - Satélite de Coleta de Dados – Brazilian satellites
  - Television Infrared Observation Satellite – Series of early American weather satellites
- First national communications satellites
  - Al Yah 1 – Communications satellite
  - Alcomsat-1 – Algerian communications satellite
  - AMOS (satellite) – Series of Israeli communications satellites
  - Anik (satellite) – Series of Canadian satellites by Telesat
  - Arab Satellite Communications Organization – Arab satellite operator
  - Astra (satellite) – Geostationary communication satellites
  - Bangladesh Satellite-1 – First Bangladeshi geostationary communications satellite
  - Brasilsat A1 – Brazilian communications satellite
  - Chinasat – Brand name of communications satellites
  - Dong Fang Hong 2
  - Hispasat – Spanish satellite operator
  - Indian National Satellite System – Series of multipurpose geo-stationary satellites launched by ISRO
  - INSAT-1A – Indian geostationary communications satellite
  - INSAT-1B – Defunct Indian communications and meteorology satellite
  - JSAT (satellite constellation) – Japanese commercial satellite constellation
  - Koreasat – South Korean communications satellites
  - MEASAT Satellite Systems – Malaysian Satellite Service System
  - Morelos Satellite System – Series of Mexican communications satellites
  - NigComSat-1 – Communication satellite in Nigeria
  - Nilesat – Egyptian satellite communication company
  - Nilesat 101 – Egyptian communication satellite
  - Palapa – Indonesian geostationary communications satellites
  - Thaicom – Thai company
  - Türksat (satellite) – Turkish communications satellites
- First national Earth observation satellites
  - AlSAT-1 – Algerian satellite that is part of the Disaster Monitoring Constellation
  - Amazônia-1 – Brazilian earth observation satellite
  - China–Brazil Earth Resources Satellite program – Satellite cooperation program between China and Brazil
  - Dong Fang Hong 1 – First satellite launched by China in 1970
  - DubaiSat-1 – Earth observation satellite
  - EgyptSat 1 – Egyptian space satellite
  - Fengyun – Chinese weather satellites
  - Indian Remote Sensing Programme – Series of Earth observation satellites
  - IRS-1A – Indian Earth observation satellite
  - KOMPSAT-1 – 1999–2008 South Korean satellite
  - Landsat program – American network of Earth-observing satellites for international research purposes
  - RADARSAT
  - RazakSAT – Malaysian satellite
  - SAC-D – Argentine Earth science satellite
  - SAOCOM – Argentinian Earth observation satellite
  - Satélite de Coleta de Dados – Brazilian satellites
  - SPOT (satellite) – Commercial Earth-imaging satellite system operated by the French space agency CNES
  - SumbandilaSat – South African micro Earth observation satellite
  - SUNSAT – South African amateur radio satellite
  - THEOS (satellite) – Thai Earth observation satellite
  - Timeline of first Earth observation satellites
  - VRSS-1 – Venezuelan remote sensing satellite

==== Satellites by international organization ====
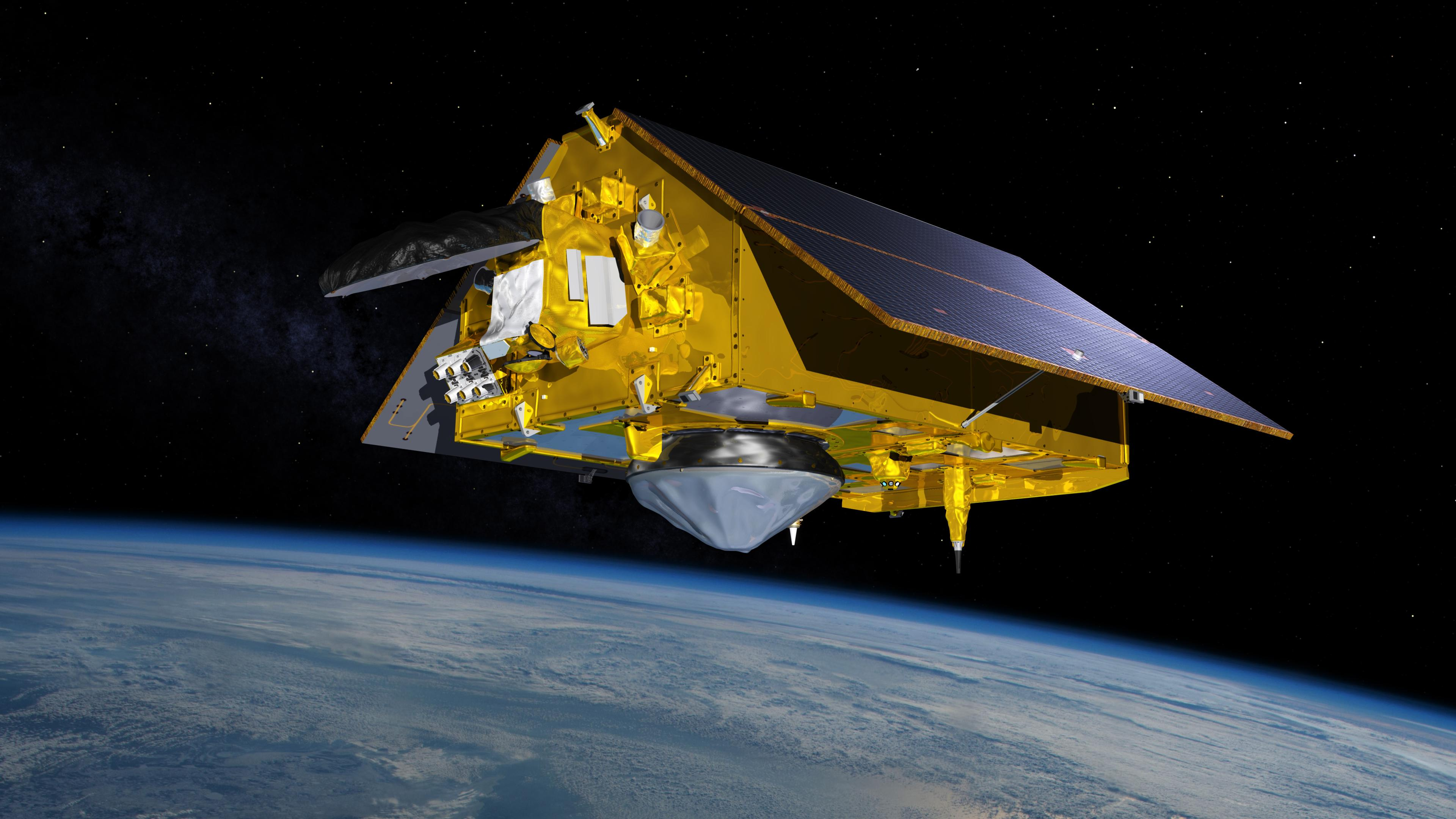
Illustration of the Sentinel-6 Michael Freilich spacecraft in orbit above Earth with its deployable solar panels extended.

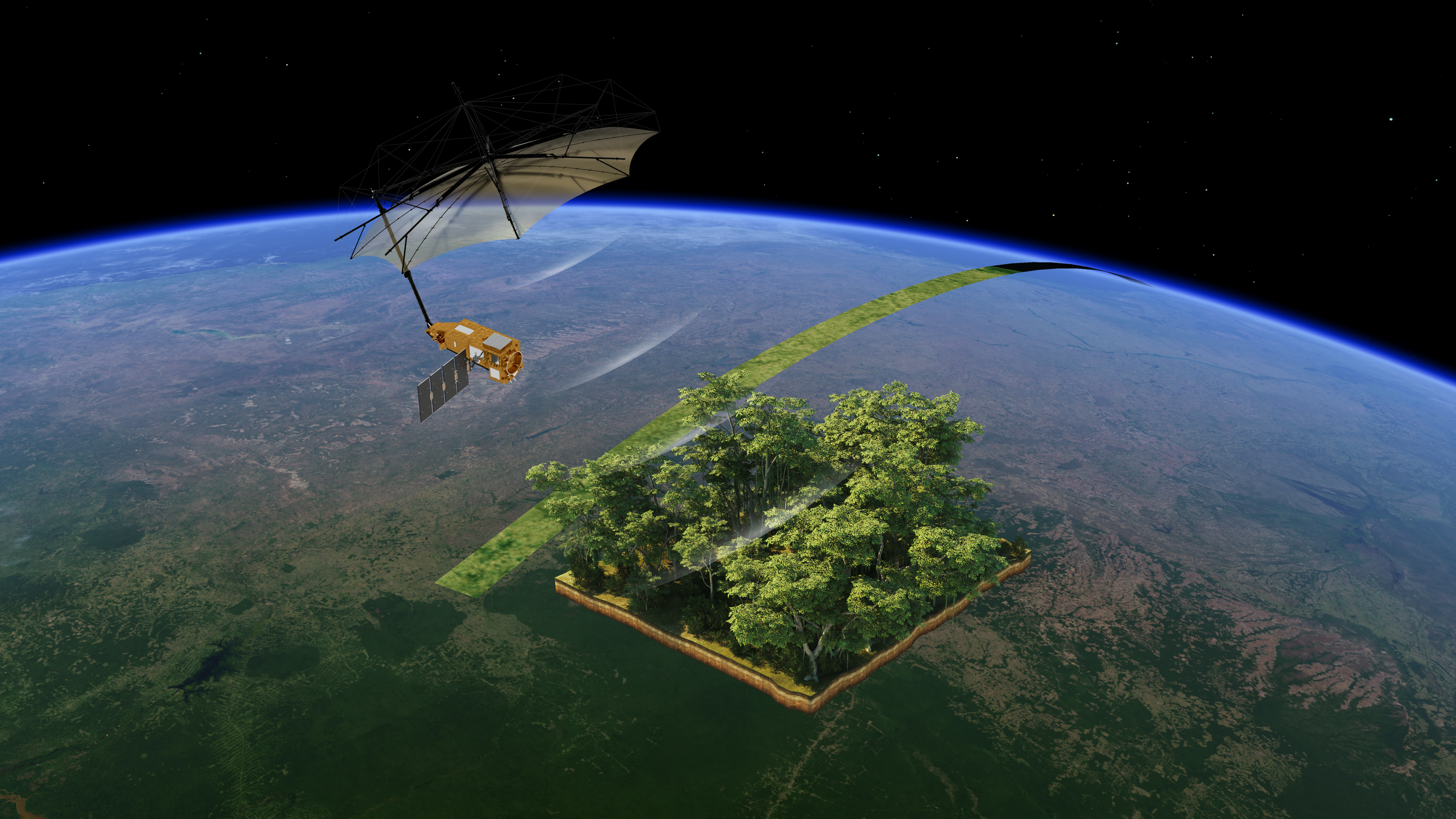
Rendering of the European Space Agency's Biomass satellite.

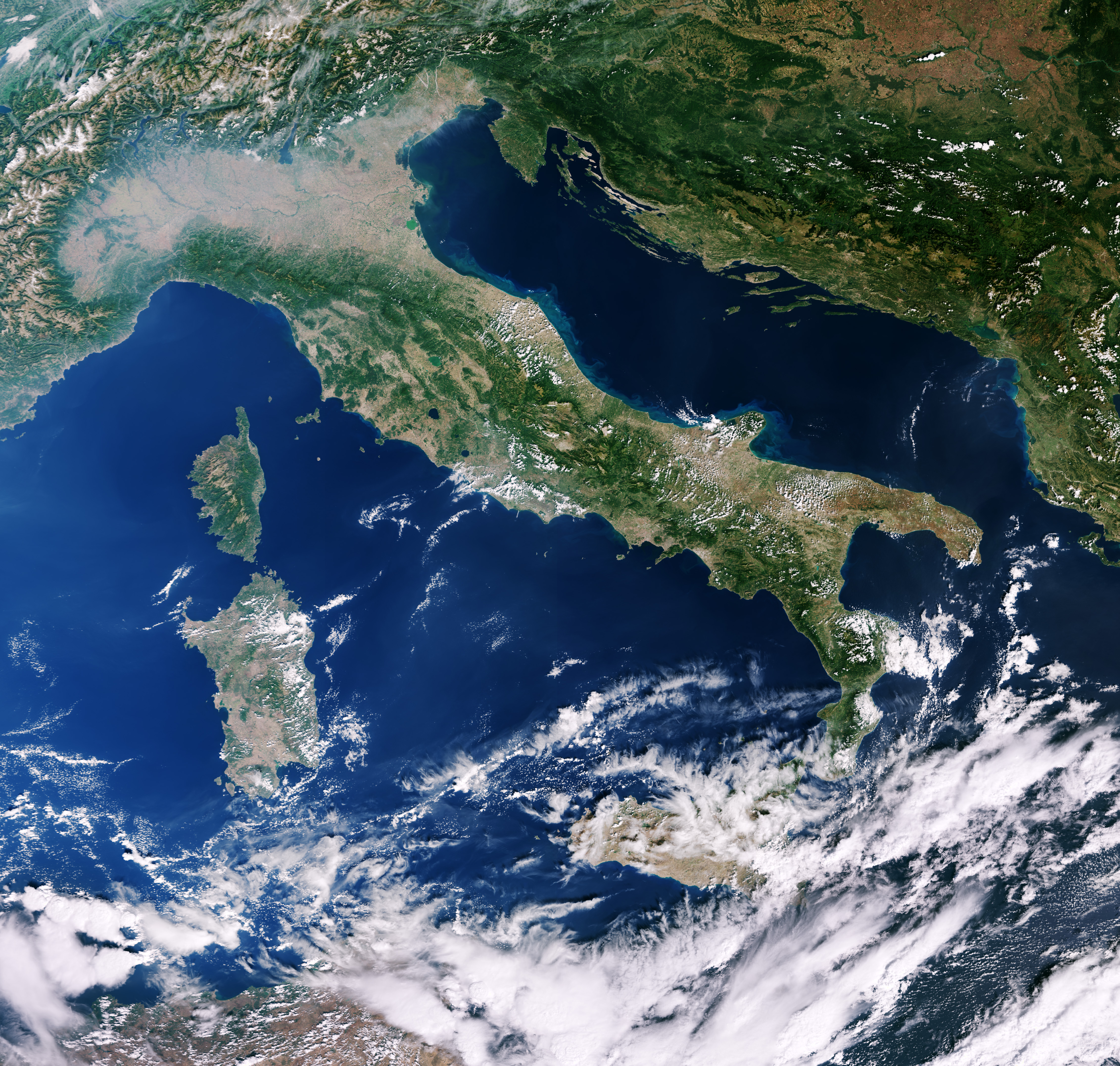
Italian Peninsula and the Mediterranean Sea, image captured by Copernicus Programme Sentinel-3A in 2016.

- EUMETSAT satellites
  - Arctic Weather Satellite – European weather satellite
  - EPS-Sterna – European weather satellite constellation
  - EUMETSAT – European intergovernmental organisation
  - Jason satellite series – Series of Earth observation satellites
  - Jason-3 – International Earth observation satellite mission
  - Meteosat – Series of european weather satellites
  - Meteosat 8 – European weather satellite (2002–2022)
  - MetOp – Series of European meteorological satellites
  - MetOp-SG – European meteorological satellites
  - MTG-I1 – European Geosynchronous Meteorology satellite
  - OSTM/Jason-2 – International Earth observation satellite mission
  - Sentinel-3 – Earth observation satellite series
  - Sentinel-4 – Series of European Earth observation satellite missions
  - Sentinel-5 Precursor – European Earth observation satellite
  - Sentinel-6 Michael Freilich – Earth observation satellite
- European Space Agency satellites
  - ADM-Aeolus – Wind-measuring satellite
  - BepiColombo – ESA/JAXA mission to study Mercury in orbit (2018–present)
  - Biomass (satellite) – European earth observation satellite
  - CHEOPS – European optical space telescope launched in 2019
  - Cluster II (spacecraft) – European Space Agency space mission
  - Copernicus Programme – EU Earth-observation programme
  - CryoSat – ESA programme monitoring polar ice using satellites
  - CryoSat-2 – European Space Agency environmental research satellite
  - EarthCARE – European/Japanese Earth research satellite
  - Envisat – ESA Earth observation satellite (2002–2012)
  - Euclid (space telescope) – European visible and near-infrared space observatory, launched in 2023
  - European Remote-Sensing Satellite – European Space Agency Earth-observing satellite program
  - European Space Agency – European organisation dedicated to space exploration
  - Gaia (spacecraft) – European optical space observatory for astrometry
  - Giotto (spacecraft) – European mission to comets Halley and Grigg–Skjellerup (1985–1992)
  - GOCE – ESA satellite to map Earth's gravity field
  - Herschel Space Observatory – ESA space telescope in service 2009–2013
  - Hipparcos – European Space Agency scientific satellite
  - Huygens (spacecraft) – First spacecraft to land on Titan
  - INTEGRAL – European space telescope for observing gamma rays
  - Jupiter Icy Moons Explorer – European mission to study Jupiter and its moons since 2023
  - LISA Pathfinder – 2015 European Space Agency spacecraft
  - Mars Express – European orbiter mission to Mars (2003–present)
  - Planck (spacecraft) – Space observatory
  - PROBA – European Space Agency satellite
  - PROBA-2 – European Space Agency satellite
  - PROBA-3 – European Space Agency mission
  - PROBA-V – European Space Agency satellite
  - Rosetta (spacecraft) – European mission to study Comet 67P/Churyumov-Gerasimenko (2004–2016)
  - Sentinel-1 – Earth observation satellite
  - Sentinel-2 – Earth observation mission
  - Sentinel-3 – Earth observation satellite series
  - Sentinel-5 Precursor – European Earth observation satellite
  - SMART-1 – European Space Agency satellite that orbited the Moon
  - Solar Orbiter – European space-based solar observatory
  - Soil Moisture and Ocean Salinity – ESA earth observation satellite
  - Swarm (spacecraft) – ESA's space program to study Earth's magnetic field
  - Venus Express – European orbiter mission to Venus (2005–2015)
  - XMM-Newton – X-ray space observatory
- International satellite programs
  - Copernicus Programme – EU Earth-observation programme
  - Disaster Monitoring Constellation – Satellite constellation
  - EUMETSAT – European intergovernmental organisation
  - European Space Agency – European organisation dedicated to space exploration
  - Galileo (satellite navigation system) – European global navigation satellite system
  - Global Precipitation Measurement – Joint mission between JAXA and NASA
  - International Cospas-Sarsat Programme – International satellite-aided search and rescue initiative
  - International Space Station – Modular space station in low Earth orbit
  - List of Galileo satellites
  - Meteosat – Series of european weather satellites
  - MetOp – Series of European meteorological satellites
  - Sentinel-1 – Earth observation satellite
  - Sentinel-2 – Earth observation mission
  - Sentinel-3 – Earth observation satellite series
  - Sentinel-5 Precursor – European Earth observation satellite
  - Sentinel-6 Michael Freilich – Earth observation satellite
- Multinational satellite programs
  - BepiColombo – ESA/JAXA mission to study Mercury in orbit (2018–present)
  - CALIPSO – Environmental satellite
  - Cassini–Huygens – Mission to Saturn (1997–2017)
  - China–Brazil Earth Resources Satellite program – Satellite cooperation program between China and Brazil
  - CloudSat – NASA Earth observation satellite
  - Double Star (satellite) – Chinese-European joint satellite
  - EarthCARE – European/Japanese Earth research satellite
  - Global Precipitation Measurement – Joint mission between JAXA and NASA
  - GRACE and GRACE-FO – Joint American-German space mission to map Earth's gravitational field
  - James Webb Space Telescope – NASA/ESA/CSA space telescope launched in 2021
  - Megha-Tropiques – Indian-French weather satellite
  - NISAR (satellite) – Joint NASA-ISRO synthetic radar aperture spacecraft
  - OSTM/Jason-2 – International Earth observation satellite mission
  - SARAL – Indian earth observation satellite
  - Sentinel-6 Michael Freilich – Earth observation satellite
  - Solar and Heliospheric Observatory – European space observatory
  - TOPEX/Poseidon – Satellite mission to map ocean surface topography
  - Trace Gas Orbiter – Mars orbiter, part of ExoMars programme
  - Tropical Rainfall Measuring Mission – Joint space mission between NASA and JAXA

==== Satellites by major spacefaring country ====
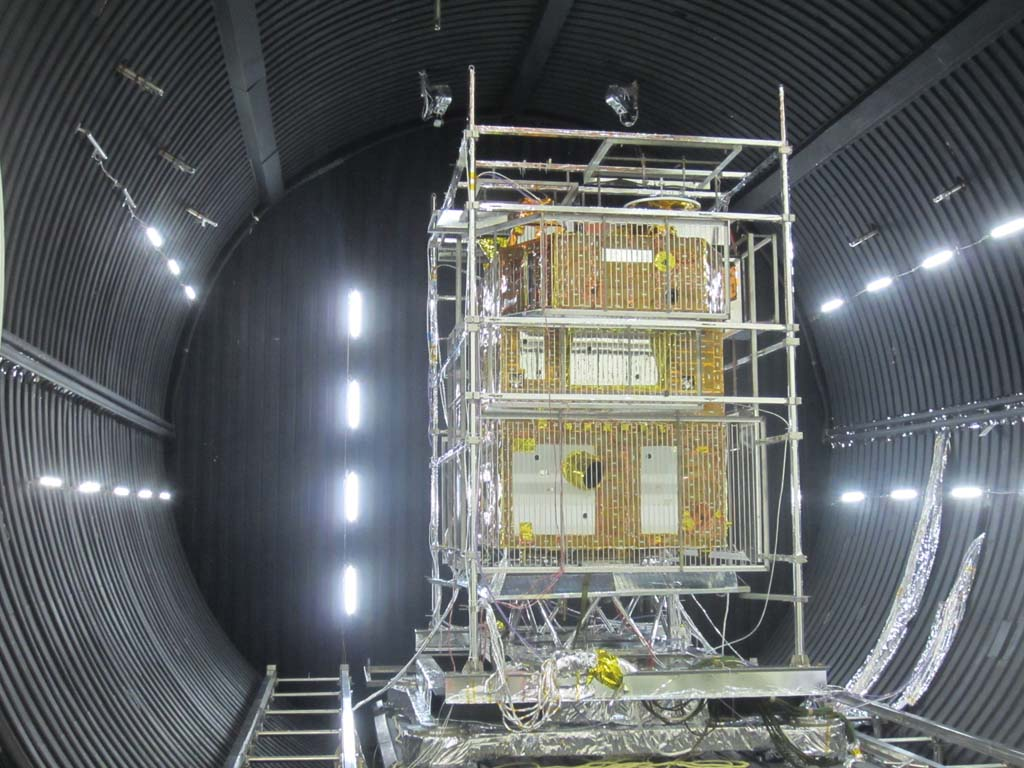
Brazil's CBERS-4 at China in 2014. A remote sensing satellite, CBERS-4 is part of the China–Brazil Earth Resources Satellite program.

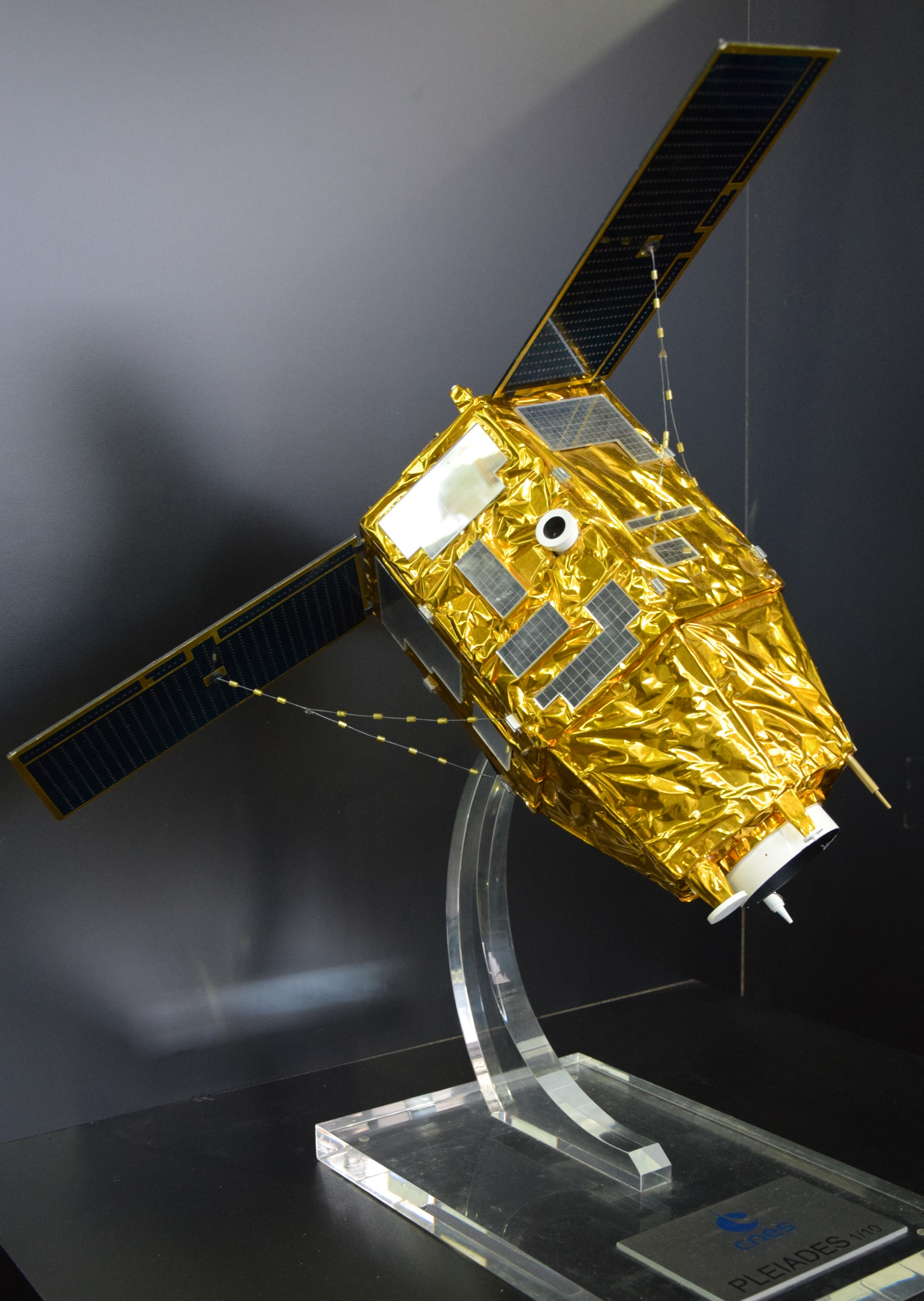
The Pléiades is a satellite constellation of optical Earth-imaging satellites.

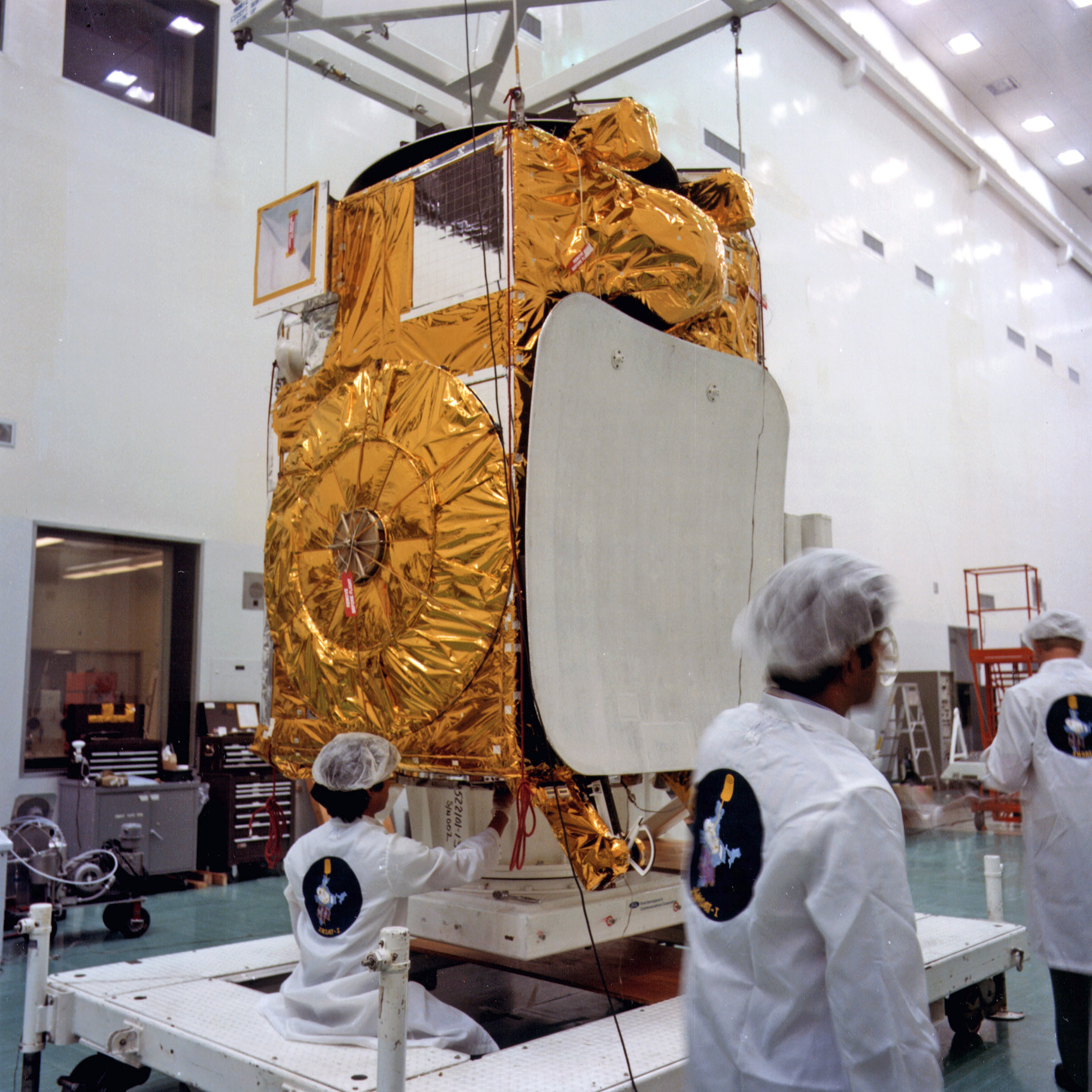
INSAT-1B was an Indian communications satellite which formed part of the Indian National Satellite System, and launched in 1983.

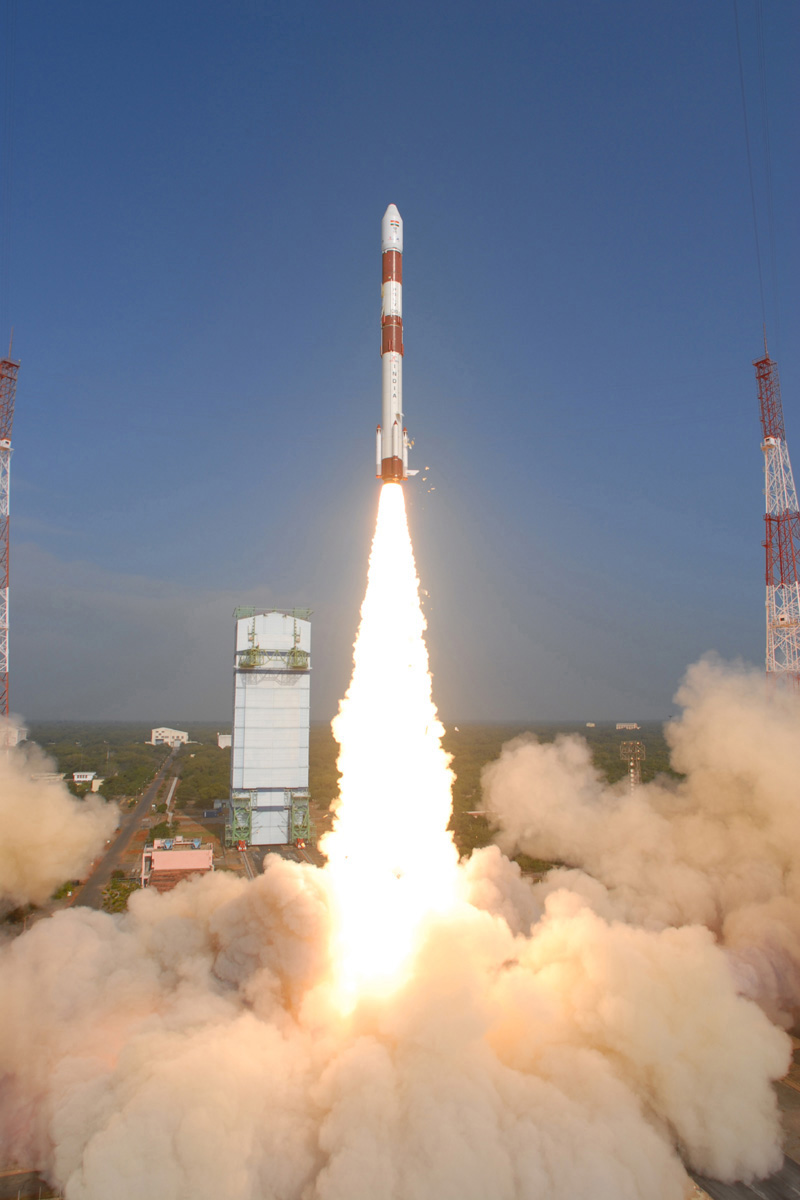
TecSAR-1 is an Israeli reconnaissance satellite, equipped with a synthetic-aperture radar (SAR) developed by Elta Systems. It was launched in 2008 by the PSLV C-10 launch vehicle, from the Satish Dhawan Space Centre in India.

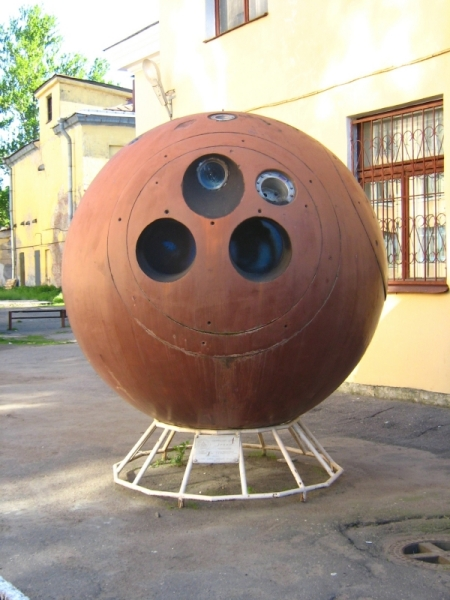
Zenit (Russian: Зени́т, lit. 'Zenith', IPA: [zʲɪˈnʲit]) was a series of military photoreconnaissance satellites launched by the Soviet Union between 1961 and 1994. To conceal their nature, all flights were given the public Kosmos designation.

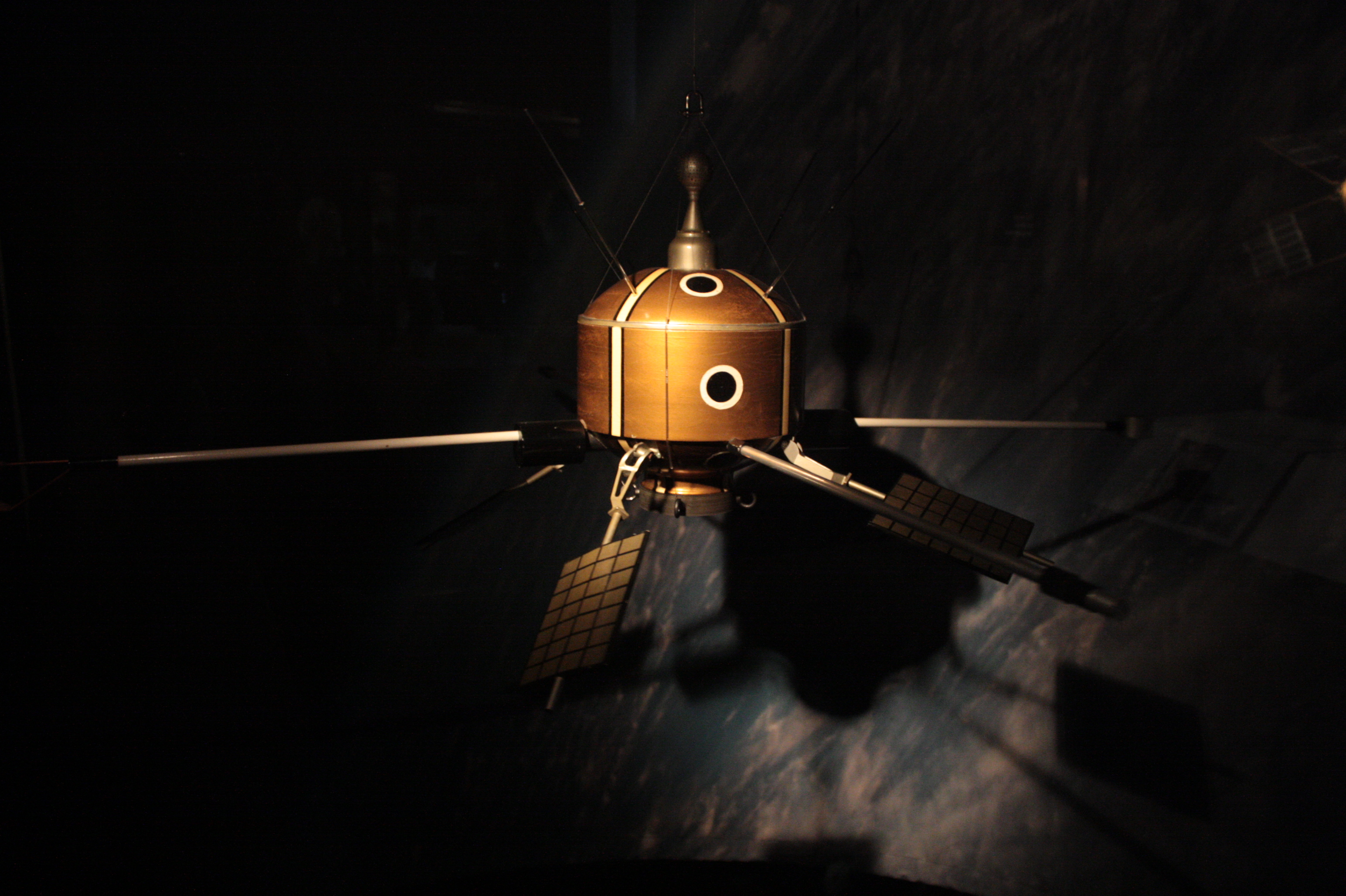
Ariel 1 satellite model, London Science Museum.

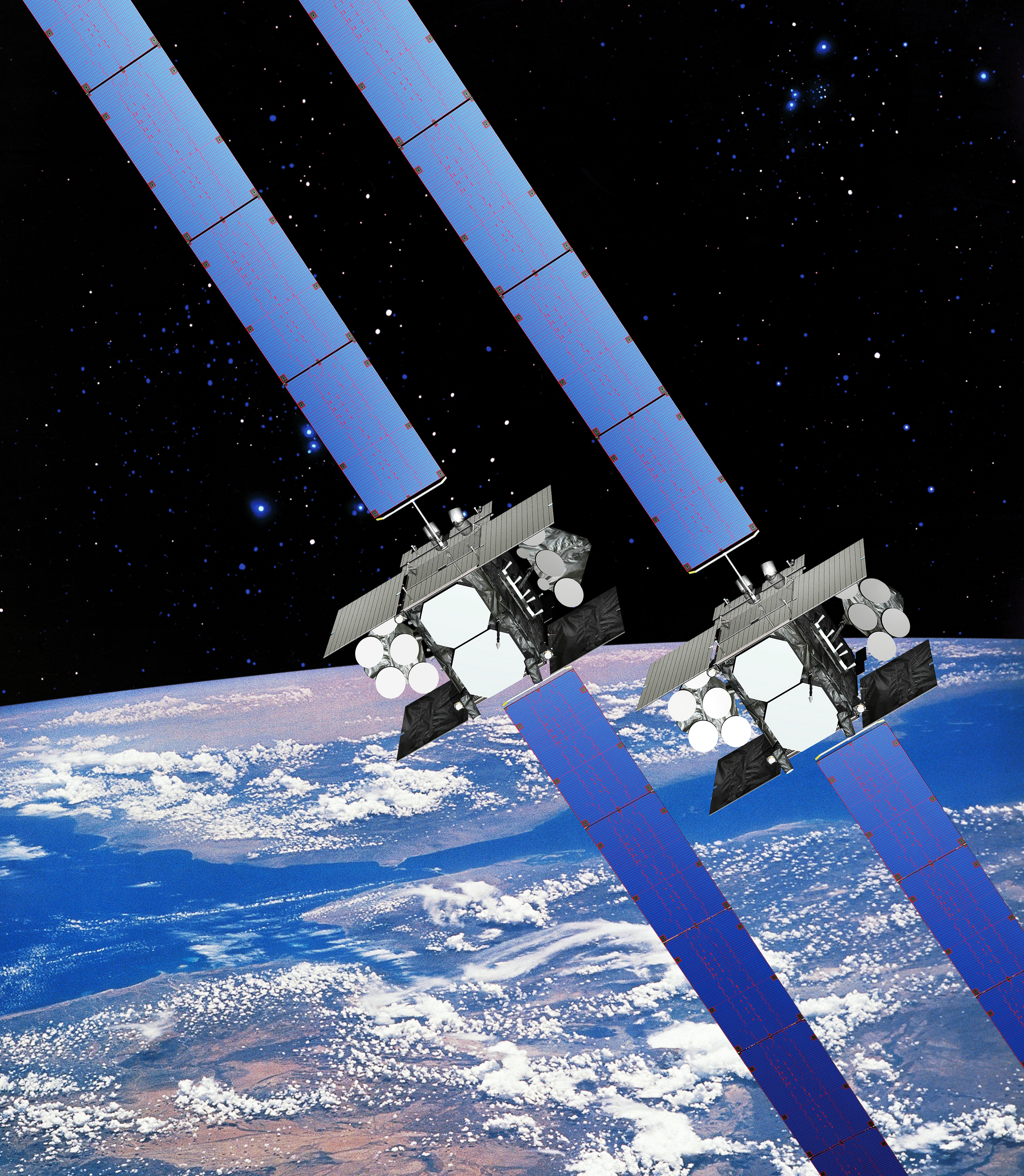
Illustration of the Wideband Global SATCOM satellites.

- Satellites of Brazil
  - AESP-14 – Brazilian cubesat
  - Amazônia-1 – Brazilian earth observation satellite
  - Brasilsat A1 – Brazilian communications satellite
  - CBERS-1 – First satellite cooperation program between China and Brazil
  - CBERS-2 – Second satellite cooperation program between China and Brazil
  - CBERS-2B – Chinese-Brazilian remote sensing satellite
  - CBERS-3 – Chinese-Brazilian remote sensing satellite
  - CBERS-4 – Chinese-Brazilian remote sensing satellite
  - China–Brazil Earth Resources Satellite program – Satellite cooperation program between China and Brazil
  - Geostationary Satellite for Defense and Strategic Communications – Brazilian geostationary communication satellite
  - List of Brazilian satellites
  - SABIA-Mar – Dual satellite joint Earth observation mission
  - SACI-1 – Brazilian satellite
  - Satélite de Coleta de Dados – Brazilian satellites
  - Satélite de Reentrada Atmosférica
  - Satélite Tecnológico – Brazilian satellite
  - Tancredo-1 – Brazilian satellite
  - UNOSAT (satellite) – Brazilian scientific nanosatellite
- Satellites of China
  - BeiDou – Chinese global navigation satellite system
  - BeiDou-3 M1 – Chinese navigation satellites
  - China–Brazil Earth Resources Satellite program – Satellite cooperation program between China and Brazil
  - ChinaSat 9 – Chinese communications satellite
  - ChinaSat 9A – Chinese communications satellite
  - ChinaSat 10 – Chinese communications satellite
  - Chinasat – Brand name of communications satellites
  - Dong Fang Hong 1 – First satellite launched by China in 1970
  - Dong Fang Hong 2
  - Dongfanghong program – Satellite program of the People's Republic of China
  - Fengyun – Chinese weather satellites
  - Gaofen – Chinese earth imaging satellites
  - Haiyang (satellite) – Chinese ocean observation satellite
  - Huanjing (satellite) – Chinese environmental monitoring satellites
  - Jilin-1 – Chinese commercial satellite system
  - Pujiang-1 – Chinese technology demonstration satellite
  - Quantum Experiments at Space Scale – Chinese quantum research satellite
  - Shijian – Series of Chinese satellites
  - Shiyan (satellite) – Chinese satellite program
  - TanSat – Chinese observation satellite
  - Tianhui (satellite)
  - Tianlian – Tracking and Data Relay Satellite System
  - Tiantong (satellite) – Chinese mobile communications satellite system
  - Yaogan – Chinese military reconnaissance satellite program
  - Ziyuan (satellite) – Chinese remote sensing satellites
- Satellites of France
  - Astérix (satellite) – First French satellite
  - Athena-Fidus – French-Italian telecommunication satellite
  - CALIPSO – Environmental satellite
  - CERES (satellite) – French military satellite program
  - Cerise (satellite) – French military reconnaissance satellite
  - CoRoT – European space telescope that operated between 2006 – 2014
  - Demeter (satellite) – French micro-satellite
  - Diadème (satellites) – Pair of French artificial satellites
  - Helios 2 (satellite) – 2000s European military observation satellites
  - Hélios 1B – French military reconnaissance satellite (1999–2004)
  - Jason-1 – Satellite oceanography mission
  - Jason-3 – International Earth observation satellite mission
  - Megha-Tropiques – Indian-French weather satellite
  - Parasol (satellite) – French Earth observation satellite
  - Picard (satellite) – Solar science research satellite
  - Pléiades (satellite) – French Earth observation satellite
  - Proteus (satellite) – Satellite platform built by Thales Group
  - SPOT (satellite) – Commercial Earth-imaging satellite system operated by the French space agency CNES
  - Syracuse (satellite) – French military communications satellite constellation
  - TOPEX/Poseidon – Satellite mission to map ocean surface topography
  - VENμS – Earth observation microsatellite
- Satellites of Germany
  - ABRIXAS – Space-based German X-ray telescope
  - AEROS
  - Azur (satellite) – West Germany's first scientific satellite
  - BIRD (satellite) – German infrared detection satellite
  - CHAMP (satellite) – Geoscientific space mission
  - DFS Kopernikus
  - DLR-Tubsat – German satellite
  - EnMAP – German hyperspectral satellite launched in 2022
  - EuCROPIS – German satellite
  - GRACE and GRACE-FO – Joint American-German space mission to map Earth's gravitational field
  - ROSAT – Satellite X-ray telescope
  - SAR-Lupe – German military reconnaissance satellite system
  - TanDEM-X – German Earth observation satellite mission
  - TerraSAR-X – German Earth observation satellite
  - TET-1
  - TV-SAT 1
  - TV-Sat 2 – West German communications satellite
  - UWE-2
- Satellites of India
  - Aryabhata (satellite) – India's first satellite in space (1975–1981)
  - Bhaskara (satellites) – Indian observations satellites
  - Cartosat – Indian Earth observation satellite series
  - EMISAT – Indian reconnaissance satellite
  - GSAT – Series of Indian communications satellites
  - GSAT-7 – Indian Navy communications satellite
  - GSAT-7A – Military communications satellite
  - Indian National Satellite System – Series of multipurpose geo-stationary satellites launched by ISRO
  - Indian Regional Navigation Satellite System – Satellite navigation system
  - Indian Remote Sensing Programme – Series of Earth observation satellites
  - INSAT-1A – Indian geostationary communications satellite
  - INSAT-1B – Defunct Indian communications and meteorology satellite
  - INSAT-3D – Satellite
  - IRS-1A – Indian Earth observation satellite
  - Kalpana-1 – Meteorological satellite
  - Mars Orbiter Mission – Indian orbiter mission to Mars (2013–2022)
  - Megha-Tropiques – Indian-French weather satellite
  - NISAR (satellite) – Joint NASA-ISRO synthetic radar aperture spacecraft
  - Oceansat – Indian class of oceanography satellites
  - RISAT – Series of Indian radar imaging satellites
  - RISAT-1 – Indian Earth observation satellite
  - SARAL – Indian earth observation satellite
- Satellites of Iran
  - Fajr (satellite) – 2015 imaging satellite of the Iranian Space Agency
  - Khayyam satellite – Iranian satellite
  - Nahid-1 – Failed-to-launch Iranian Earth observation satellite
  - Navid (satellite) – Iranian Earth observation satellite
  - Noor (satellite) – Iranian military satellite
  - Noor 2 (satellite) – Iranian military satellite
  - Noor 3 (satellite) – Iranian military satellite
  - Omid – Iranian communications satellite
  - Rasad 1 – Iranian satellite
  - Sina-1 – Iranian orbital satellite
  - Soraya (satellite) – Iranian satellite
- Satellites of Israel
  - AMOS (satellite) – Series of Israeli communications satellites
  - AMOS-1 (satellite) – AMOS communications satellite
  - AMOS-2 (satellite) – AMOS communications satellite
  - AMOS-3 (satellite) – AMOS communications satellite
  - AMOS-4 (satellite) – AMOS communications satellite
  - AMOS-5 (satellite) – AMOS communications satellite
  - AMOS-6 (satellite) – AMOS communications satellite destroyed during a launch test
  - BGUSAT – Israeli research satellite
  - EROS (satellite) – Israeli commercial Earth observation satellite series
  - Ofek-16 – Israeli reconnaissance satellite
  - Ofeq – Israeli reconnaissance satellites
  - SHALOM (satellite) – Israel-Italian satellite system
  - TecSAR-1 – Israeli reconnaissance satellite
  - ULTRASAT – Planned space telescope
  - VENμS – Earth observation microsatellite
- Satellites of Japan
  - ADEOS I – Derelict Japanese Earth observation satellite
  - ADEOS II – Derelict Japanese Earth observation satellite
  - Advanced Land Observing Satellite – Japanese earth observation satellite (2006–2011)
  - Advanced Satellite for Cosmology and Astrophysics – Japanese cosmic X-ray astronomy mission
  - Akari (satellite) – Infrared astronomy satellite developed by Japan Aerospace Exploration Agency
  - Akebono (satellite) – Japanese satellite
  - Arase (satellite) – Japanese Van Allen belt studying satellite
  - Geotail – NASA/ISAS spacecraft
  - Greenhouse Gases Observing Satellite – Japanese Earth observation satellite
  - HALCA – Japanese space radio telescope
  - Himawari (satellites) – Geostationary meteorological satellite
  - Himawari 8 – Japanese weather satellite
  - Himawari 9 – Japanese weather satellite
  - Hinode (satellite) – Japanese satellite
  - Hisaki (satellite) – Japanese satellite
  - Hitomi (satellite) – Failed Japanese X-ray astronomy satellite
  - JERS-1
  - JSAT (satellite constellation) – Japanese commercial satellite constellation
  - LiteBIRD – Planned Japanese small space observatory
  - Ohsumi (satellite) – First Japanese satellite put into orbit, launched in 1970
  - Quasi-Zenith Satellite System – Japanese regional navigation satellite system
  - Suzaku (satellite)
  - Yohkoh – Japanese spacecraft
- Satellites of Russia and the Soviet Union
  - Arktika-M – Meteorology satellite system
  - Bion (satellite) – Soviet and Russian spacecraft aimed at biological experiments in space
  - EKS (satellite system) – Russian early warning satellites
  - Ekspress
  - Foton (satellite) – Russian spacecraft programs
  - GLONASS – Russian global navigation satellite system
  - GLONASS-K – Class of GLONASS satellites
  - GLONASS-M – Type of Russian GLONASS navigation satellite
  - Gorizont – Russian/Soviet satellites series, launched 1978–2000
  - Kosmos (satellite) – Series of Soviet and Russian military satellites
  - Kosmos 1 – Soviet research satellite
  - Luch (satellite) – Russian data relay system
  - Luna 1 – Soviet spacecraft
  - Luna 3 – Soviet lunar probe launched in 1959
  - Mars 2 – Soviet orbiter and lander mission to Mars (1971–1972)
  - Mars 3 – Soviet orbiter/lander mission to Mars (1971–1972)
  - Meridian (satellite) – Family of communication satellites
  - Meteor (satellite) – Series of weather observation satellites launched by Russia
  - Molniya (satellite) – Soviet military surveillance and communications satellites
  - Oko – Soviet (now Russian) satellite-based early warning system for ballistic missiles
  - Persona (satellite) – Class of Russian reconnaissance satellites
  - Resurs-DK No.1 – Russian Earth observation satellite
  - Sputnik 1 – First artificial Earth satellite
  - Sputnik 2 – Second spacecraft launched into Earth orbit (1957)
  - Sputnik 3 – Third Artificial Earth Satellite
  - Venera 1 – Soviet space probe launched in 1961; first spacecraft to fly by Venus
  - Venera 9 – 1975 Soviet uncrewed space mission to Venus
  - Yantar (satellite) – Series of Russian reconnaissance satellites
  - Zenit (satellite) – Series of Soviet spy satellites, 1961–2004
- Satellites of South Korea
  - 425 Project – South Korean Reconnaissance satellite Program
  - ANASIS-II – South Korean communication satellite
  - CAS500 – South Korean satellite launched in 2021
  - Chollian – South Korean satellite (2010–2020)
  - Chollian-2A – South Korean weather satellite
  - Chollian-2B – South Korean weather satellite
  - KITSAT-1 – First South Korean satellite
  - KITSAT-2 – 1993 South Korean satellite
  - KITSAT-3 – 1999 South Korean satellite
  - KOMPSAT – South Korean multipurpose satellite
  - KOMPSAT-1 – 1999–2008 South Korean satellite
  - KOMPSAT-2 – South Korean Earth observation satellite
  - KOMPSAT-3 – South Korean Earth observation satellite
  - KOMPSAT-3A – South Korean Earth observation satellite
  - KOMPSAT-5 – South Korean reconnaissance satellite
  - Koreasat – South Korean communications satellites
  - Koreasat 1 – South Korean satellite launched in 2017
  - Koreasat 5 – South Korea's satellite launched in 2006
  - Koreasat 5A – South Korean satellite launched in 2017
  - Koreasat 6 – South Korean satellite launched in 2010
  - Koreasat 7 – South Korean satellite launched in 2017
  - NEXTSat-1 – South Korean satellite launched in 2018
  - NEXTSat-2
  - STSat-1 – South Korean satellite launched in 2003
- Satellites of the United Kingdom
  - Ariel 1 – First British satellite
  - Ariel programme – Early British satellite research programme
  - Prospero (spacecraft) – British experimental satellite launched in 1971
  - Skynet (satellite) – Communications satellite
  - Skynet 5A – British military communications satellite
  - Skynet 5B – British military communications satellite
  - Skynet 5C – British military communications satellite
  - Skynet 5D – Communications satellite launched 2012
  - TechDemoSat-1 – European technology demonstration satellite
  - TopSat – British Earth observation satellite
  - UK-DMC – British remote sensing satellite
- Satellites of the United States
  - 2001 Mars Odyssey – NASA orbiter for geology and hydrology
  - Advanced Extremely High Frequency – Series of American military communications satellites
  - Aqua (satellite) – NASA scientific research satellite (2002–present)
  - Chandra X-ray Observatory – NASA space telescope launched in 1999
  - CORONA (satellite) – American reconnaissance satellites (1959–1972)
  - Cosmic Background Explorer – NASA satellite of the Explorer program
  - Deep Space Climate Observatory – American solar research spacecraft
  - Defense Meteorological Satellite Program – United States Department of Defense weather monitoring program
  - Defense Satellite Communications System – Defense satellite communications project
  - Defense Support Program – US infrared satellite early warning system
  - Explorer 1 – First satellite launched by the United States (1958)
  - Fermi Gamma-ray Space Telescope – Space telescope for gamma-ray astronomy launched in 2008
  - Geostationary Operational Environmental Satellite – US weather satellite series
  - Global Positioning System – American satellite-based radio navigation service
  - GPS satellite blocks – Generations of US navigation satellites
  - Hubble Space Telescope – NASA/ESA space telescope launched in 1990
  - ICESat-2 – NASA Earth observation satellite
  - Iridium satellite constellation – Satellite constellation providing voice and data coverage
  - KH-11 KENNEN – Type of American spy satellite
  - Landsat 1 – American earth observation satellite (1972–1978)
  - Landsat 8 – American earth observation satellite
  - Landsat 9 – American earth observation satellite
  - Landsat program – American network of Earth-observing satellites for international research purposes
  - MAVEN – NASA Mars orbiter (2013–2025)
  - Mars Reconnaissance Orbiter – NASA spacecraft active since 2005
  - NOAA-1 – Weather satellite (1970–1971)
  - NOAA-20 – American weather satellite
  - Orbcomm – American wireless networking and telecommunications company
  - Parker Solar Probe – NASA probe of the Sun's outer corona
  - SCORE (satellite) – First ever communications satellite
  - Spitzer Space Telescope – NASA infrared space telescope (2003–2020)
  - Starlink – SpaceX satellite Internet constellation
  - Suomi NPP – American Earth weather satellite (2011–present)
  - Telstar 1 – Defunct Communications Satellite
  - Terra (satellite) – NASA climate research satellite (1999–present)
  - TIROS-1 – 1960 weather satellite
  - Tracking and Data Relay Satellite System – Network of American communications satellites
  - Transit (satellite navigation system) – Satellite navigation system
  - Wideband Global SATCOM – Defense satellite communications project
  - Wilkinson Microwave Anisotropy Probe – NASA satellite of the Explorer program

==== Satellites by region ====
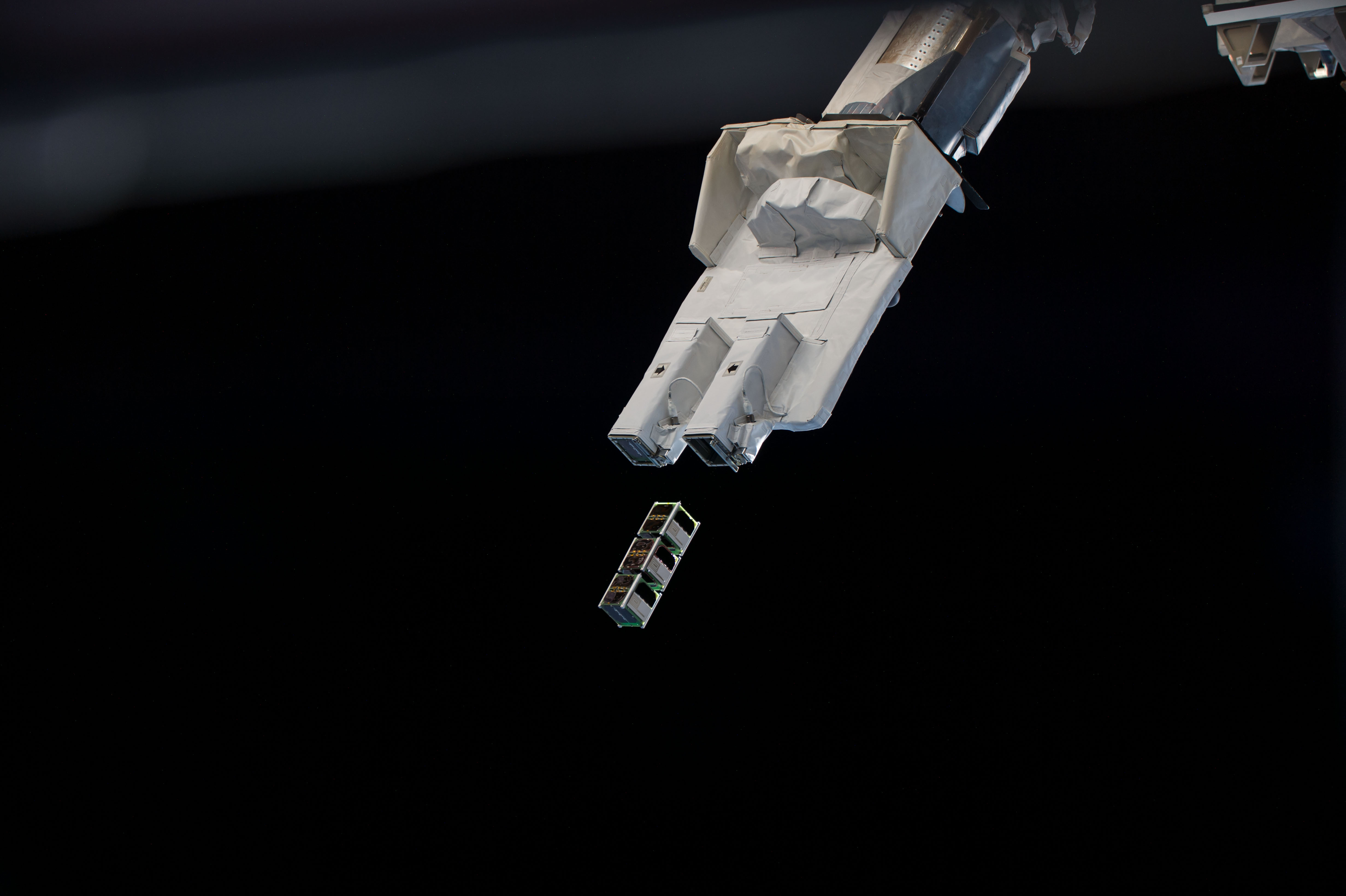
GhanaSat-1 in the middle of three other deploying CubeSats during the Birds-1 mission.

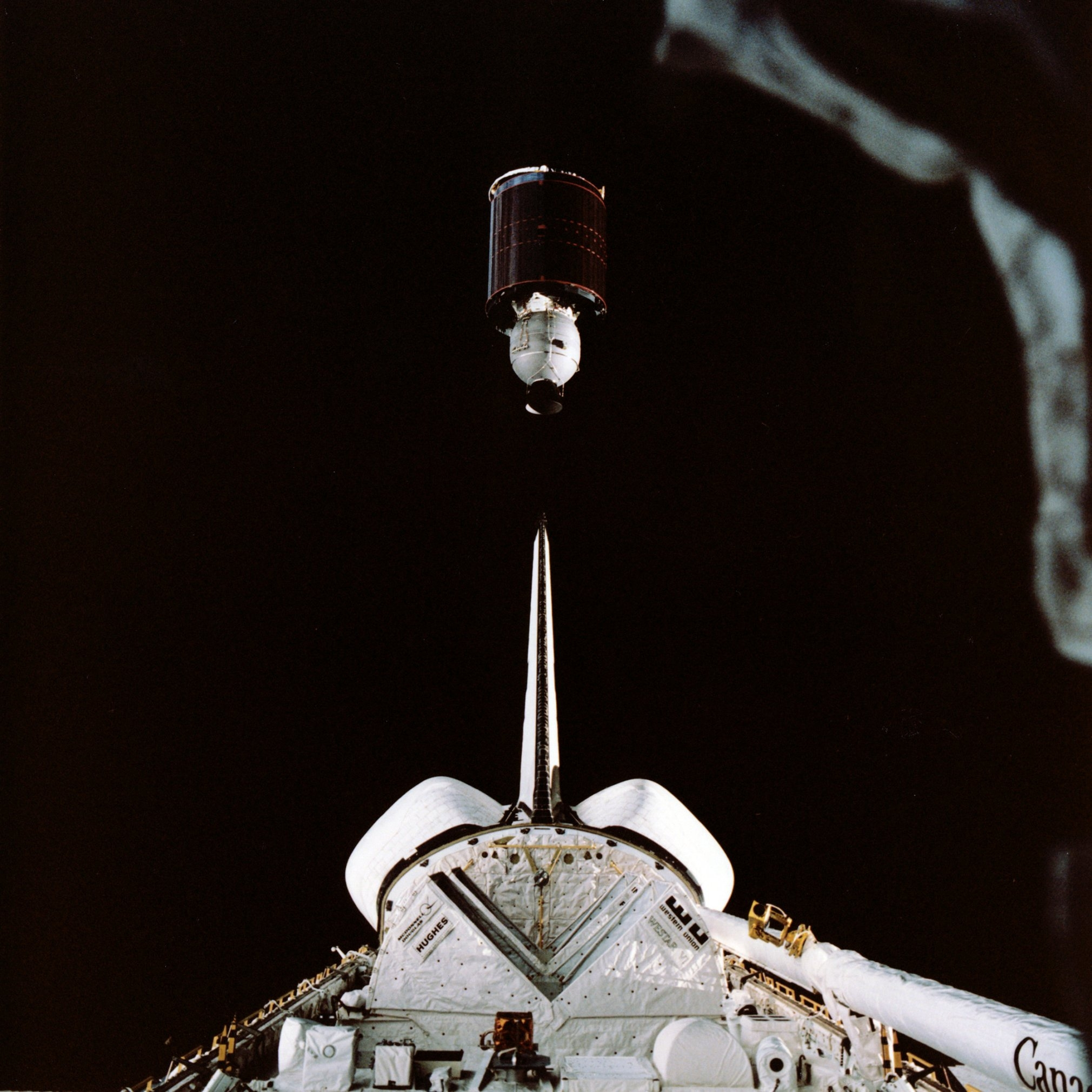
View of the Palapa-B2 satellite from Challenger after deployment on STS-41B in 1984.

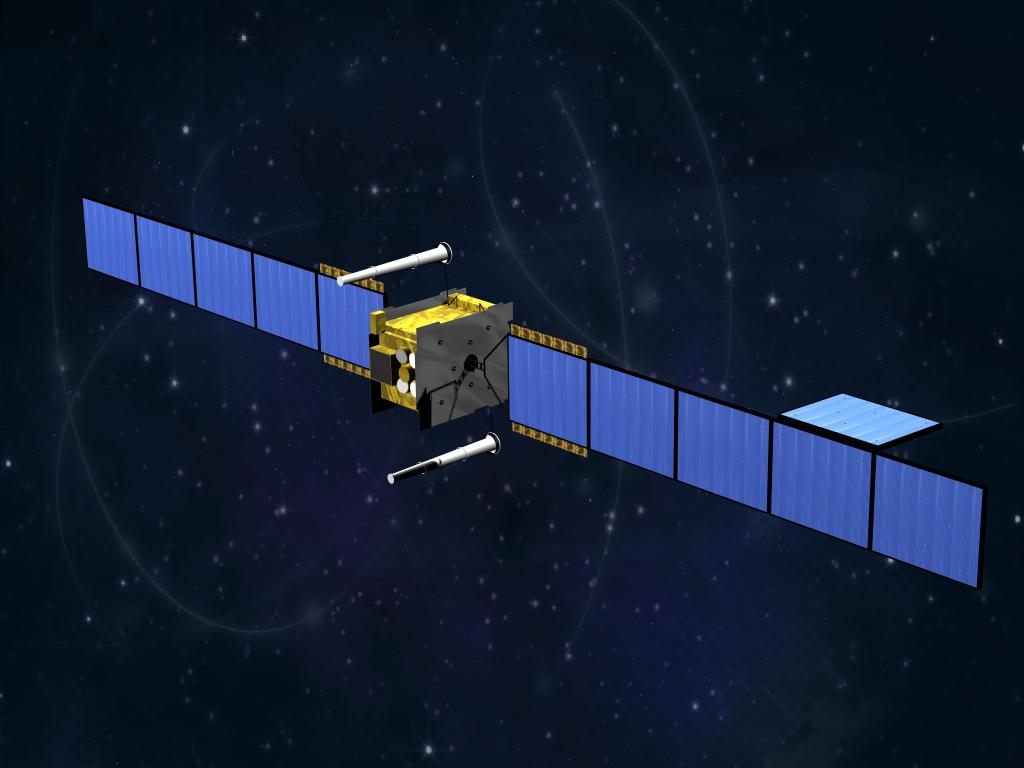
An artist's impression of the United Kingdom's Skynet.

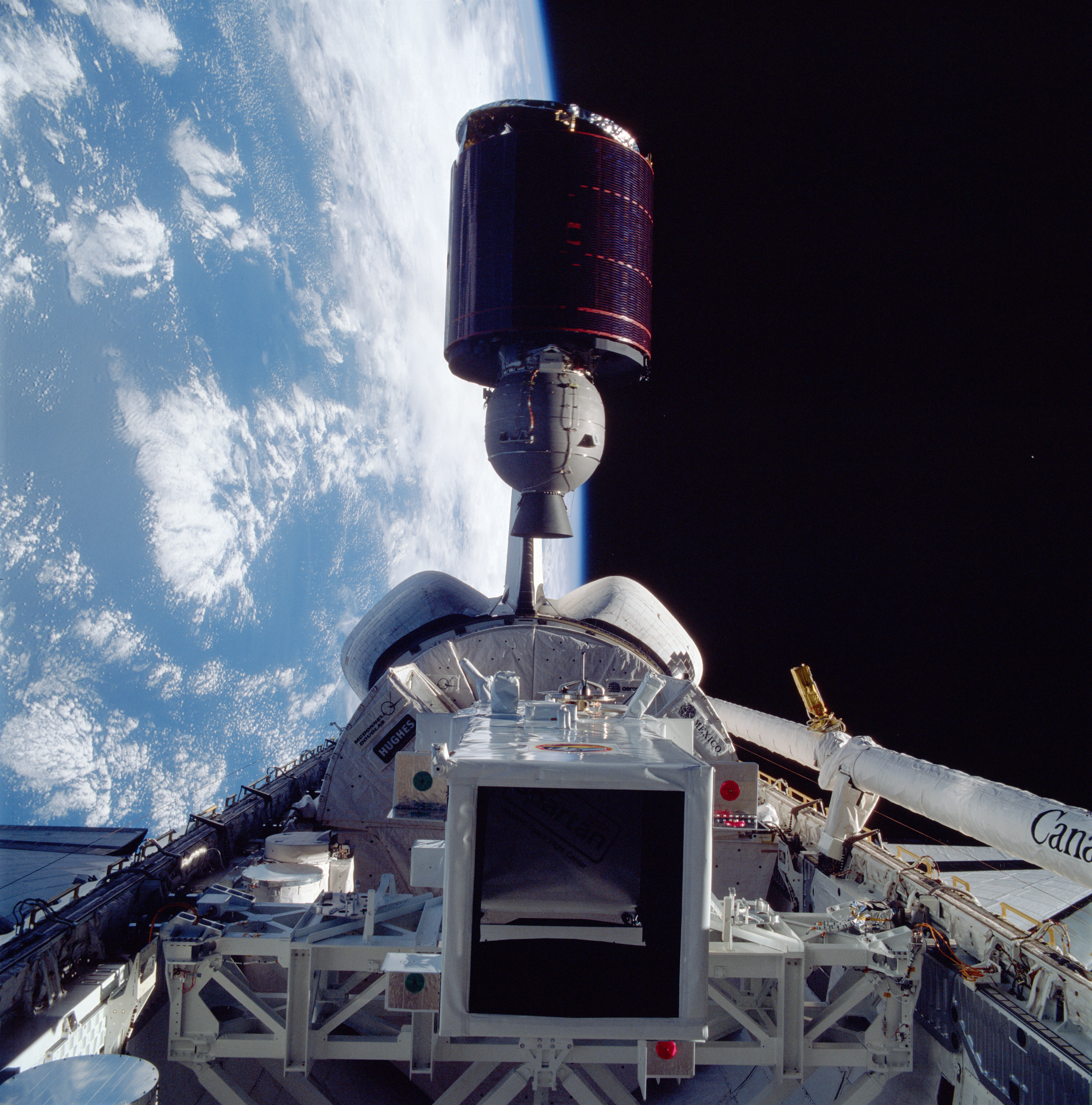
Discovery deploying a Mexican Morelos satellite.

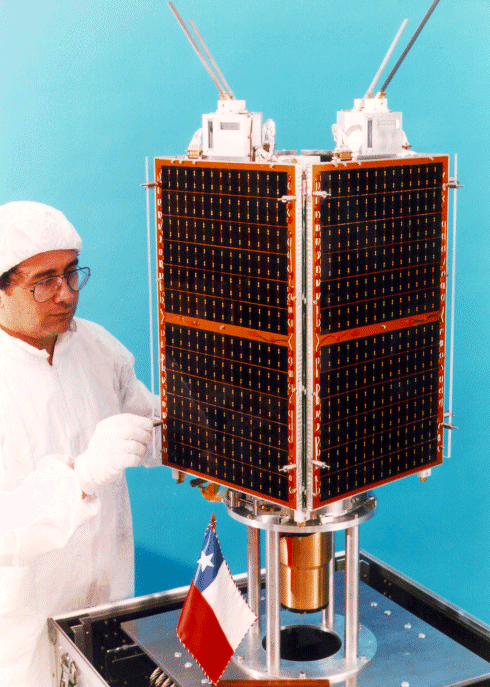
FASat-Alfa was to be Chile's first satellite. The Alpha launch in 1995 was unsuccessful, when the satellite failed to deploy from a paired Ukrainian craft. In 1998, the Bravo launch was successful.

- African satellites
  - AngoSat 1 and AngoSat 2 – Angolan communications satellites.
  - EgyptSat 1, EgyptSat 2, and EgyptSat-A – Egyptian Earth observation satellites.
  - 1KUNS-PF – Kenyan owned satellite
  - African Space Agency – African Union's space organisation
  - Alcomsat-1 – Algerian communications satellite
  - ETRSS-1 – Ethiopian satellite
  - GhanaSat-1 – First ghanaian spacecraft
  - List of first artificial satellites by country – First artificial satellites launched by country or territory
  - NigComSat-1 – Communication satellite in Nigeria
  - Nilesat – Egyptian satellite communication company
    - Nilesat 101 – Egyptian communication satellite
    - Nilesat 102 – Egyptian communications satellite
    - Nilesat 201 – Egyptian communications satellite
  - SumbandilaSat – South African micro Earth observation satellite
  - SUNSAT – South African amateur radio satellite
- Asian satellites
  - DubaiSat-1 and DubaiSat-2 – Emirati Earth observation satellites.
  - Al Yah 1 – Communications satellite
  - AMOS (satellite) – Series of Israeli communications satellites
  - Aryabhata (satellite) – India's first satellite in space (1975–1981)
  - Bangladesh Satellite-1 – First Bangladeshi geostationary communications satellite
  - BHUTAN-1 – First Bhutanese nanosatellite
  - Cartosat – Indian Earth observation satellite series
  - ChinaSat – Brand name of communications satellites
    - BeiDou-3 M1 – Chinese navigation satellites
  - Dong Fang Hong 1 – First satellite launched by China in 1970
  - GSAT – Series of Indian communications satellites
  - Himawari (satellite) – Geostationary meteorological satellite
  - INSAT – Series of multipurpose geo-stationary satellites launched by ISRO
    - INSAT-1A – Indian geostationary communications satellite
    - INSAT-1B – Defunct Indian communications and meteorology satellite
    - INSAT-3D – Satellite
  - JCSAT – Japanese commercial satellite constellation
  - KOMPSAT – South Korean multipurpose satellite
  - Kwangmyŏngsŏng program – North Korean satellite program
  - List of first artificial satellites by country – First artificial satellites launched by country or territory
  - Oceansat – Indian class of oceanography satellites
  - Ofeq – Israeli reconnaissance satellites
  - Ohsumi (satellite) – First Japanese satellite put into orbit, launched in 1970
  - Omid – Iranian communications satellite
  - Palapa – Indonesian geostationary communications satellites
  - Thaicom – Thai company
  - THEOS (satellite) – Thai Earth observation satellite
  - Yaogan – Chinese military reconnaissance satellite program
- European satellites
  - Astra (satellite) – Geostationary communication satellites
  - CNES satellites
  - Envisat – ESA Earth observation satellite (2002–2012)
  - Eutelsat – French-based satellite provider
  - European Organisation for the Exploitation of Meteorological Satellites – European intergovernmental organisation
  - European Space Agency – European organisation dedicated to space exploration
  - Galileo (satellite navigation) – European global navigation satellite system
    - Galileo satellites
  - Hipparcos – European Space Agency scientific satellite
  - Meteosat – Series of european weather satellites
  - Planck (spacecraft) – Space observatory
  - PROBA – European Space Agency satellite
  - Prospero (satellite) – British experimental satellite launched in 1971
  - Sentinel satellites
  - SES S.A. – Communications satellite owner and operator
  - Skynet (satellite) – Communications satellite
  - SPOT (satellite) – Commercial Earth-imaging satellite system operated by the French space agency CNES
  - XMM-Newton – X-ray space observatory
- North American satellites
  - Alouette 1 – First Canadian satellite
  - Anik (satellite) – Series of Canadian satellites by Telesat
  - Corona (satellite) – American reconnaissance satellites (1959–1972)
  - Defense Meteorological Satellite Program – United States Department of Defense weather monitoring program
  - Explorer 1 – First satellite launched by the United States (1958)
  - Geostationary Operational Environmental Satellite – US weather satellite series
  - Global Positioning System – American satellite-based radio navigation service
    - GPS satellites – Generations of US navigation satellites
  - Landsat program – American network of Earth-observing satellites for international research purposes
  - MEXSAT – Network of communications satellites operated by the Mexican government
  - Morelos (satellite) – Series of Mexican communications satellites
  - NASA – American space and aeronautics agency
  - RADARSAT
  - SCISAT-1 – Canadian satellite
  - Tracking and Data Relay Satellite System – Network of American communications satellites
  - U.S. Space Force – Space service branch of the U.S. military
- Oceanian satellites
  - Aussat – Australian telecommunications company
  - Biarri-Point
  - FedSat – Australian scientific research satellite
  - Kea Aerospace – New Zealand aerospace company
  - M2 (satellite)
  - Optus (satellite) – List of communications satellites
    - Optus A1 – List of communications satellites
    - Optus A2 – List of communications satellites
    - Optus A3 – List of communications satellites
    - Optus B1 – List of communications satellites
    - Optus B3 – List of communications satellites
    - Optus D3 – Australian geostationary communications satellite
  - Rocket Lab – American public spaceflight company
  - Sky Muster – Geostationary (GEO) communications satellites operated by NBN Co Limited
  - WRESAT – First Australian satellite
- South American satellites
  - FASat-Alfa and FASat-Bravo – Chilean satellites.
  - VRSS-1 and VRSS-2 – Venezuelan remote sensing satellites.
  - Amazônia-1 – Brazilian earth observation satellite
  - ARSAT – Argentine government-owned telecommunications company incorporated in 2006
    - ARSAT-1 – Argentine geostationary communications satellite
    - ARSAT-2 – Argentine geostationary communications satellite
    - ARSAT-SG1
  - Brasilsat
    - Brasilsat A1 – Brazilian communications satellite
    - Brasilsat A2 – Brazilian geostationary communication satellite
    - Brasilsat B1 – Brazilian communications satellite
    - Brasilsat B2 – Brazilian communications satellite
  - China–Brazil Earth Resources Satellite program – Satellite cooperation program between China and Brazil
  - SAC-D – Argentine Earth science satellite
  - Satellogic – American space technology company
    - CBERS-1 – First satellite cooperation program between China and Brazil
    - CBERS-2 – Second satellite cooperation program between China and Brazil
    - CBERS-4 – Chinese-Brazilian remote sensing satellite
  - SGDC – Brazilian geostationary communication satellite
  - SUCHAI
  - VENESAT-1

==== Lists by country and operator ====
- Comparison of satellite buses
- List of Brazilian satellites
- List of Czech satellites
- List of first satellites by country – First artificial satellites launched by country or territory
- List of foreign satellites launched by India
- List of Indian satellites
- List of Philippine satellites
- List of Polish satellites
- List of Slovak satellites
- Satellites of Albania
- Satellites of Bulgaria
- Satellites of Turkey – List of national programs

==== Lists by mission ====
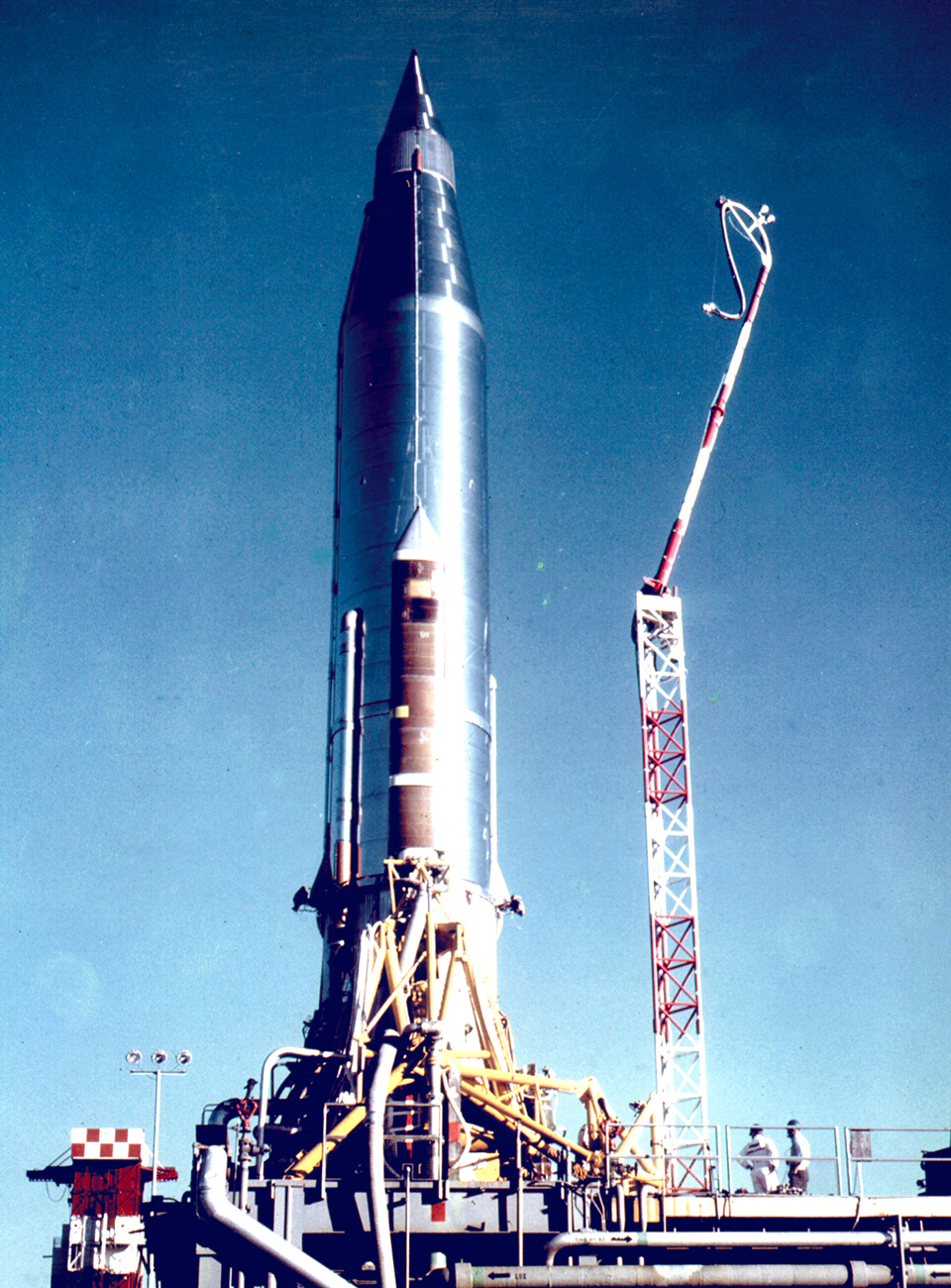
SM-65B Atlas with SCORE; the rocket without booster was the satellite.

- Communications satellite lists
  - List of communications satellite firsts
  - List of Intelsat satellites
  - List of Spacebus satellites
  - List of TDRS satellites
- Earth observation satellite lists
  - List of climate research satellites
  - List of Earth observation satellites
  - List of Sentinel satellites
  - Timeline of first Earth observation satellites
- Navigation satellite lists
  - List of BeiDou satellites
  - List of Galileo satellites
  - List of GLONASS satellites
  - List of GPS satellites
- Reconnaissance and military satellites
  - List of Kosmos satellites
  - List of Oko satellites
  - List of OPS Satellites – List of satellites launched by the United States Air Force
  - List of USA satellites
  - List of USA satellites (1-500)
  - List of USA satellites (501-1000)
- Scientific and observatory satellites
  - List of space telescopes
- Weather satellite lists
  - List of GOES satellites
  - List of NOAA satellites

==== Lists by orbit ====
- List of satellites in geostationary orbit
- List of satellites in geosynchronous orbit

==== Lists by status ====
- Category:Cancelled satellites
- Category:Derelict satellites
- Category:Proposed satellites

=== Notable satellites and milestones ===
==== Milestones by application ====
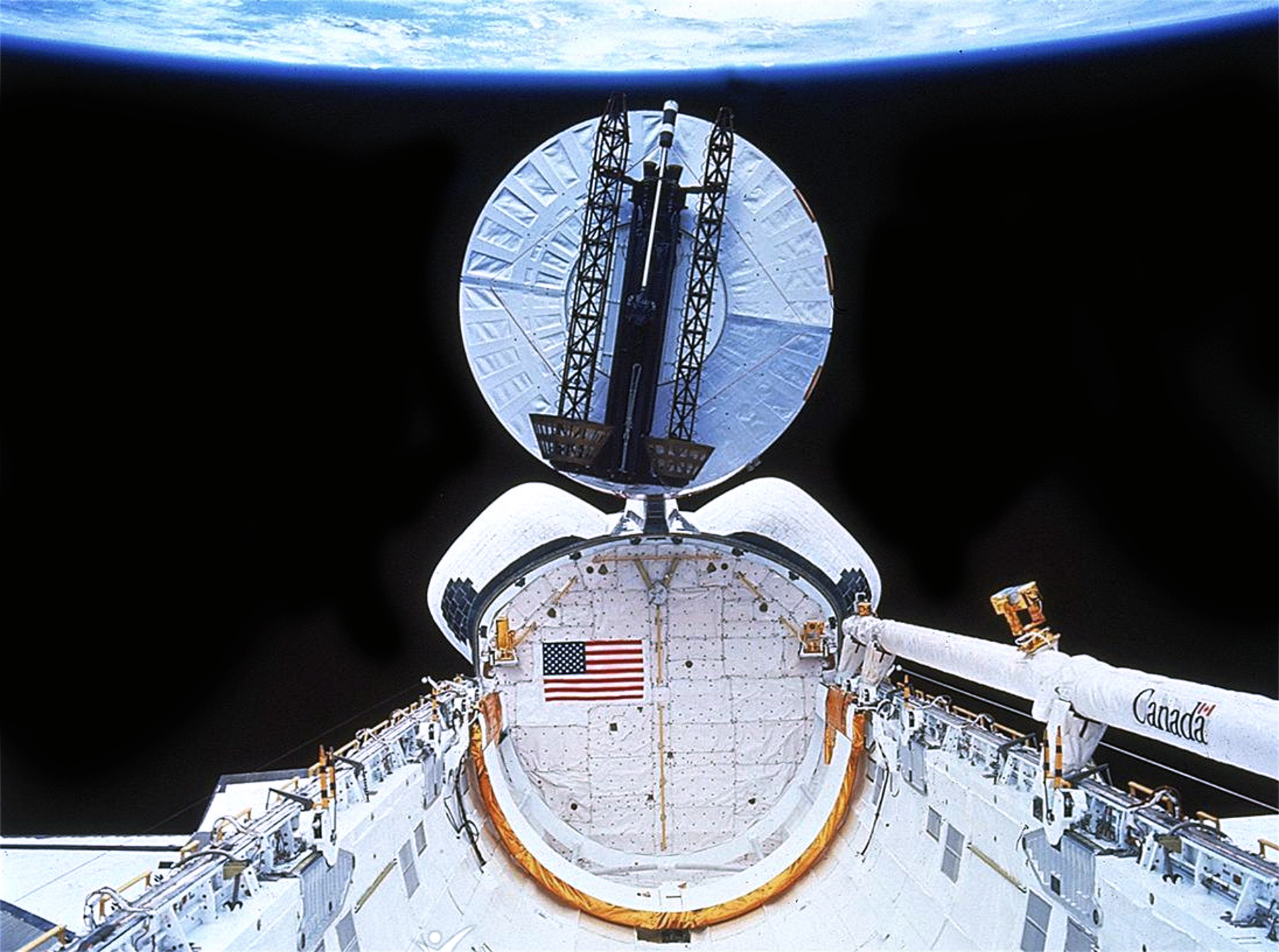
Syncom Leasat F4 released "frisbee-style" from the payload bay of space shuttle Columbia on mission STS-32.

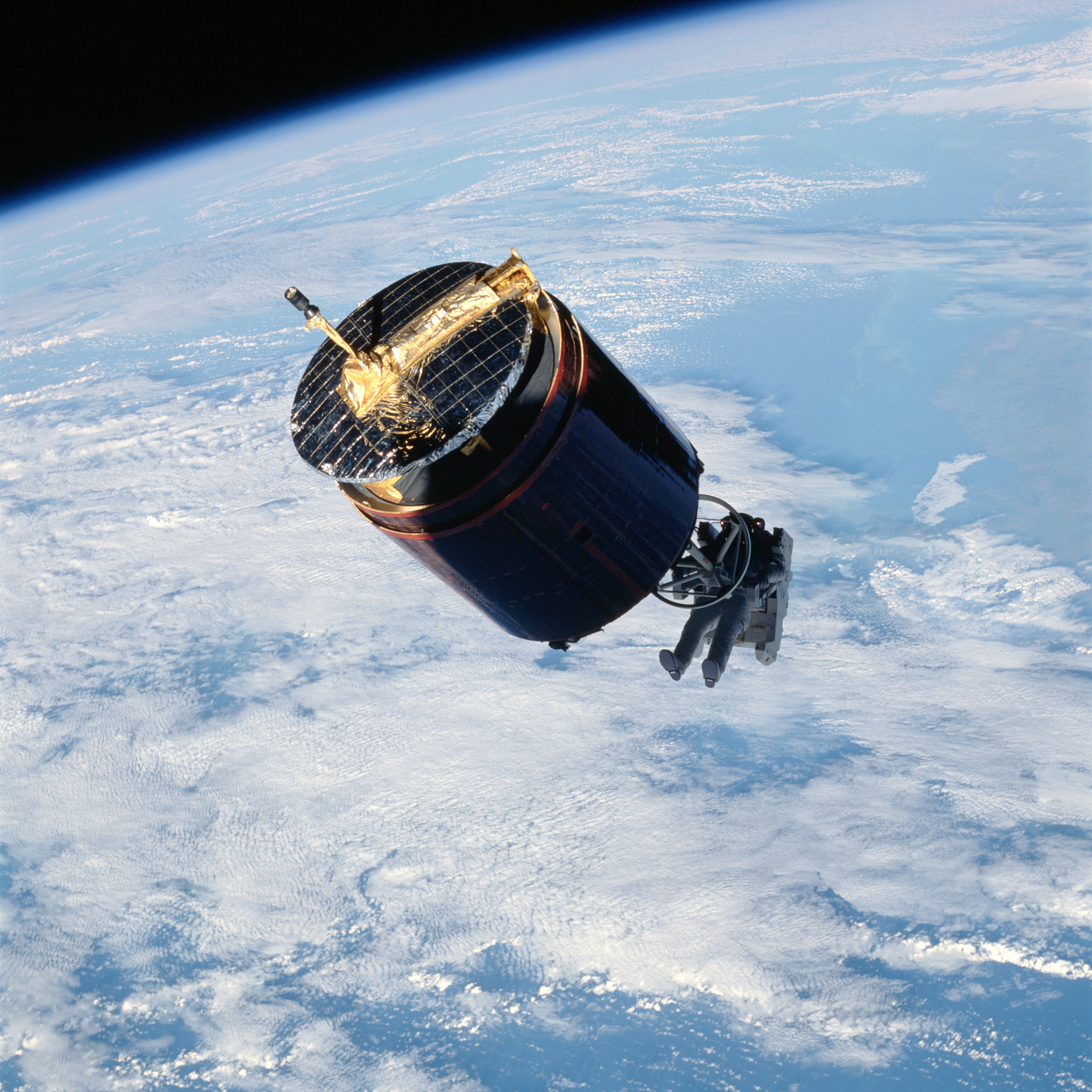
Westar 6 retrieval during space walk by astronaut Dale Gardner.

Inmarsat-3 satellite locations.

- First active communications relay satellites
  - Courier 1B – 1960 American communications satellite
  - I-4 satellite
  - List of communications satellite firsts
  - Relay program – 1960s experimental communications satellites
  - SCORE – First ever communications satellite
  - Syncom – 1960s and 80s NASA program to develop communications satellites
  - Telstar 1 – Defunct Communications Satellite
- First broadband satellite constellations
  - Amazon Leo – Amazon satellite constellation and internet service
  - Eutelsat OneWeb – Global communications company
  - Globalstar – Global satellite telecommunications company
  - Iridium satellite constellation – Satellite constellation providing voice and data coverage
  - O3b – Group of telecommunications satellites
  - Satellite Internet access – Satellite-provided Internet
  - Starlink – SpaceX satellite Internet constellation
  - Teledesic – Satellite company
  - Telesat – Canadian satellite communications company
- First geostationary communications satellites
  - Anik (satellite) – Series of Canadian satellites by Telesat
  - Applications Technology Satellites – Series of experimental satellites launched by NASA
  - ATS-1 – Early geostationary communications and weather satellite, launched in 1966
  - ATS-6 – NASA experimental satellite
  - Intelsat I – American commercial communications satellite launched in 1965
  - Satcom (satellite) – Family of communications satellites
  - Syncom – 1960s and 80s NASA program to develop communications satellites
  - Westar – Fleet of communications satellites
- First global satellite navigation systems
  - BeiDou – Chinese global navigation satellite system
  - Galileo (satellite navigation system) – European global navigation satellite system
  - Global Positioning System – American satellite-based radio navigation service
  - GLONASS – Russian global navigation satellite system
  - GPS satellite blocks – Generations of US navigation satellites
  - Timation – American satellites
  - Transit (satellite navigation system) – Satellite navigation system
- First inter-satellite relay systems
  - Artemis (satellite) – Telecommunications satellite, 2005–2014
  - European Data Relay System – Group of communication satellites
  - Indian Data Relay Satellite System – Planned communications satellites
  - Inter-satellite service – Radiocommunication between artificial satellites
  - List of TDRS satellites
  - Luch (satellite) – Russian data relay system
  - Tianlian – Tracking and Data Relay Satellite System
  - Tracking and data relay satellite – American communications satellite
  - Tracking and Data Relay Satellite System – Network of American communications satellites
- First mobile satellite systems
  - Broadband Global Area Network – Global satellite network
  - Globalstar – Global satellite telecommunications company
  - Inmarsat – British satellite communications company
  - Iridium Communications – American satellite communications company
  - Marisat – Series of communications satellites
  - Mobile satellite service – Service for mobile phones to communicate with satellites
  - Orbcomm – American wireless networking and telecommunications company
  - Satellite phone – Type of mobile phone
  - Thuraya – UAE-based satellite telecommunications company

=== First satellites by class ===
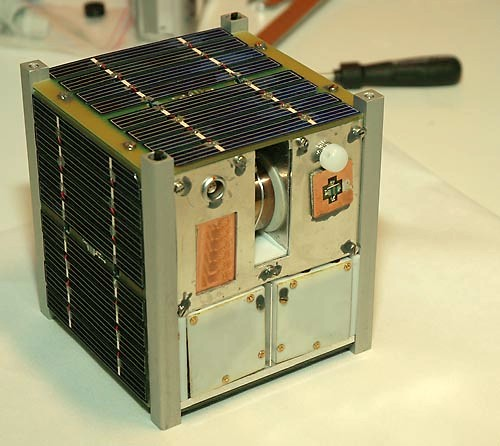
Ncube-2, a 10 cm (3.9 in) diameter satellite.

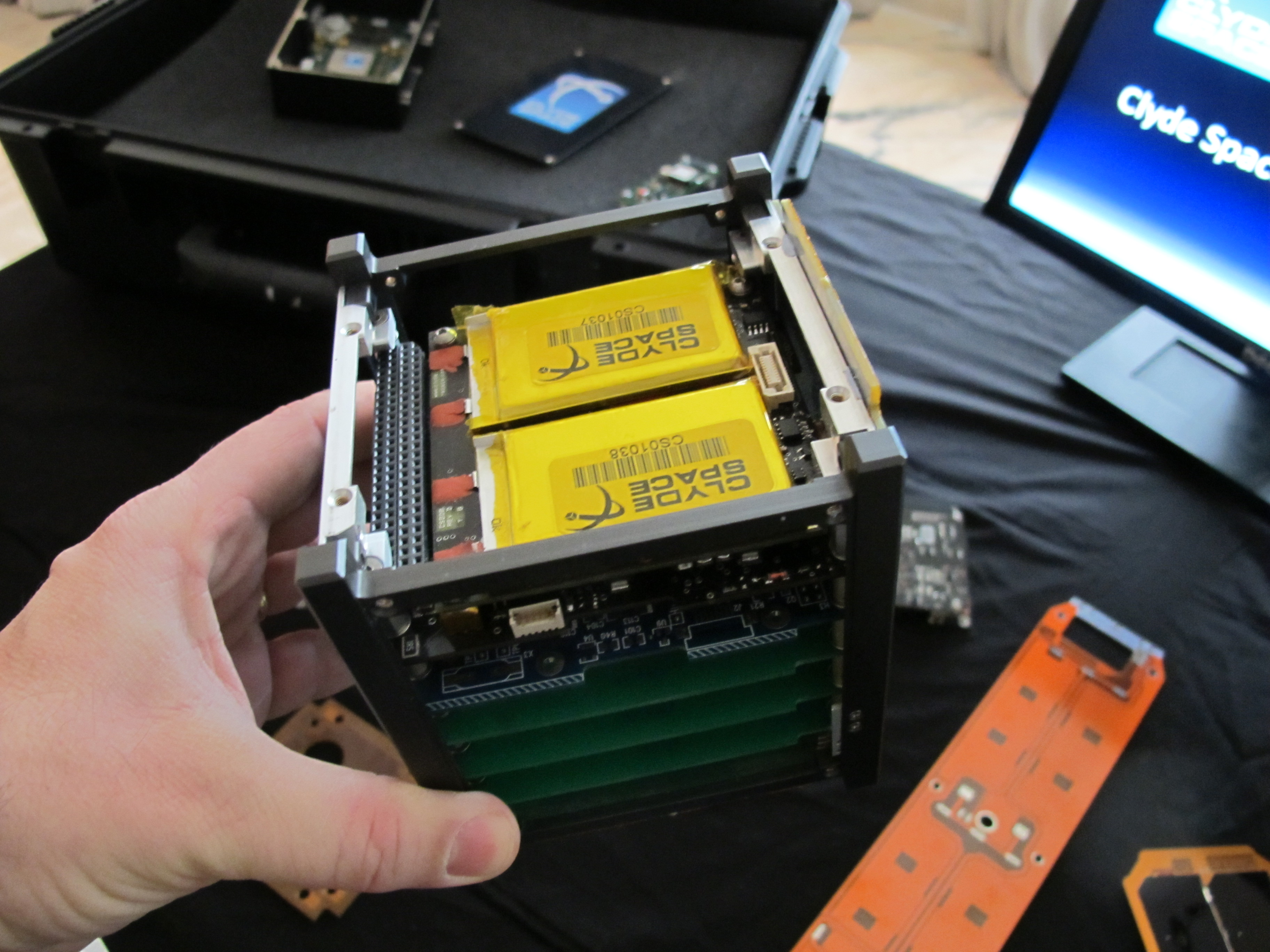
Cubesat with its outer skin removed.

Universal Newsreel about Explorer 1.

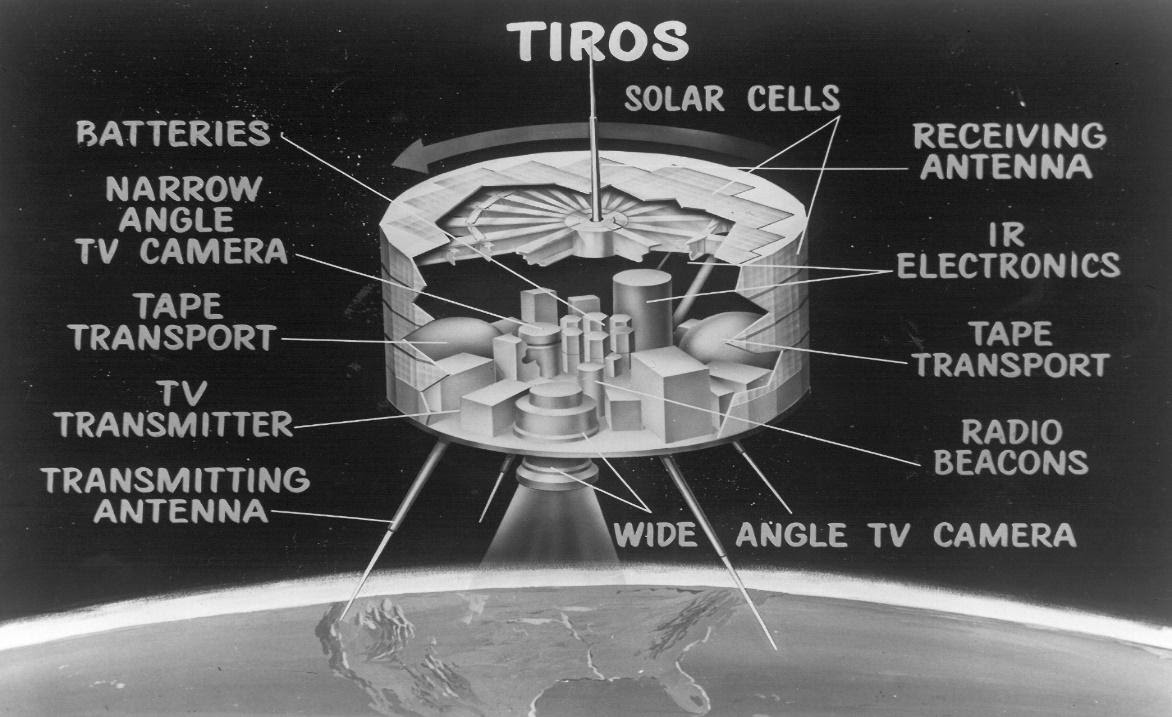
Artist rendering of the instruments aboard TIROS-1.

- First artificial satellites
  - Timeline of artificial satellites and space probes
    - List of first satellites by country – First artificial satellites launched by country or territory
      - Sputnik 1 – First artificial Earth satellite
      - Explorer 1 – First satellite launched by the United States (1958)
      - Luna 1 – Soviet spacecraft
      - Project Vanguard – U.S. Navy satellite program in the 1950s
      - Sputnik 2 – Second spacecraft launched into Earth orbit (1957)
      - Vanguard 1 – American satellite launched in 1958; oldest manmade object in Earth orbit
      - Vanguard TV-3 – U.S. satellite in 1957
- First communications satellites
  - Applications Technology Satellites – Series of experimental satellites launched by NASA
  - ATS-1 – Early geostationary communications and weather satellite, launched in 1966
  - ATS-6 – NASA experimental satellite
  - Courier 1B – 1960 American communications satellite
  - Intelsat I – American commercial communications satellite launched in 1965
  - List of communications satellite firsts
  - Project Echo – First passive communications satellite experiment
  - Relay program – 1960s experimental communications satellites
  - SCORE – First ever communications satellite
  - Syncom – 1960s and 80s NASA program to develop communications satellites
  - Telstar 1 – Defunct Communications Satellite
- First CubeSats
  - AAU CubeSat – CubeSat built and operated by Aalborg University, Denmark
  - Canadian Advanced Nanospace eXperiment Program – Canadian CubeSat nanosatellite program
  - CP1
  - CUTE-1.7 + APD – Amateur radio satellite launched in 2006
  - Educational Launch of Nanosatellites – NASA educational satellite program
  - GeneSat-1 – NASA cubesat
  - List of CubeSats
  - Quakesat – Earth Observation nanosatellite
- First navigation satellites
  - BeiDou – Chinese global navigation satellite system
  - Galileo (satellite navigation system) – European global navigation satellite system
  - Global Positioning System – American satellite-based radio navigation service
  - GLONASS – Russian global navigation satellite system
  - GPS satellite blocks – Generations of US navigation satellites
  - Indian Regional Navigation Satellite System – Satellite navigation system
  - Quasi-Zenith Satellite System – Japanese regional navigation satellite system
  - Timation – American satellites
  - Transit (satellite navigation system) – Satellite navigation system
- First reconnaissance satellites
  - CORONA (satellite) – American reconnaissance satellites (1959–1972)
  - Discoverer 1 – American reconnaissance satellite launched in 1959; failed to achieve orbit
  - Discoverer 14 – American reconnaissance satellite
  - Galactic Radiation and Background – First US orbital surveillance program
  - Imagery intelligence – Intelligence gathered by means of imagery
  - Reconnaissance satellite – Satellite that covertly collects data for intelligence or military applications
  - Samos (satellite) – Series of reconnaissance satellites for the United States
  - Signals intelligence – Intelligence-gathering by interception of signals
  - Zenit (satellite) – Series of Soviet spy satellites, 1961–2004
- First national satellite milestones
  - List of first satellites by country – First artificial satellites launched by country or territory
    - Alouette 1 – First Canadian satellite
    - Ariel 1 – First British satellite
    - Aryabhata (satellite) – India's first satellite in space (1975–1981)
    - Astérix (satellite) – First French satellite
    - Dong Fang Hong 1 – First satellite launched by China in 1970
    - Ohsumi (satellite) – First Japanese satellite put into orbit, launched in 1970
    - San Marco 1 – First Italian satellite
    - Sputnik 1 – First artificial Earth satellite
    - WRESAT – First Australian satellite
- First scientific satellites
  - Alouette 1 – First Canadian satellite
  - Ariel 1 – First British satellite
  - Explorer 6 – NASA satellite of the Explorer program
  - Explorer 12 – NASA satellite of the Explorer program
  - Interplanetary Monitoring Platform – NASA program to investigate interplanetary plasma and magnetic field
  - Orbiting Astronomical Observatory 2 – Space telescope launched on 7 December 1968
  - Orbiting Solar Observatory – Series of American solar space observatories
  - Sputnik 3 – Third Artificial Earth Satellite
  - Uhuru (satellite) – NASA X-ray astronomy satellite (1970–1973, decay 1979)
  - Vanguard 1 – American satellite launched in 1958; oldest manmade object in Earth orbit
  - Vanguard 2 – US Navy satellite launched in 1959
  - Vanguard 3 – American research satellite launched in 1959
- First weather satellites
  - Applications Technology Satellites – Series of experimental satellites launched by NASA
  - Defense Meteorological Satellite Program – United States Department of Defense weather monitoring program
  - ESSA-1 – Former American weather satellite
  - Geostationary Operational Environmental Satellite – US weather satellite series
  - GOES 1 – NOAA weather satellite
  - List of GOES satellites
  - List of NOAA satellites
  - Meteor (satellite) – Series of weather observation satellites launched by Russia
  - Meteosat – Series of european weather satellites
  - Nimbus 1 – Former U.S. meteorological satellite
  - Nimbus program – Second-generation U.S. robotic spacecraft
  - NOAA-1 – Weather satellite (1970–1971)
  - Synchronous Meteorological Satellite – Weather satellite program of the United States
  - Television Infrared Observation Satellite – Series of early American weather satellites
  - TIROS-1 – 1960 weather satellite
  - Tiros – Town and municipality in the state of Minas Gerais, Brazil
  - TIROS-N – U.S. weather satellite

==== Historically significant satellites ====
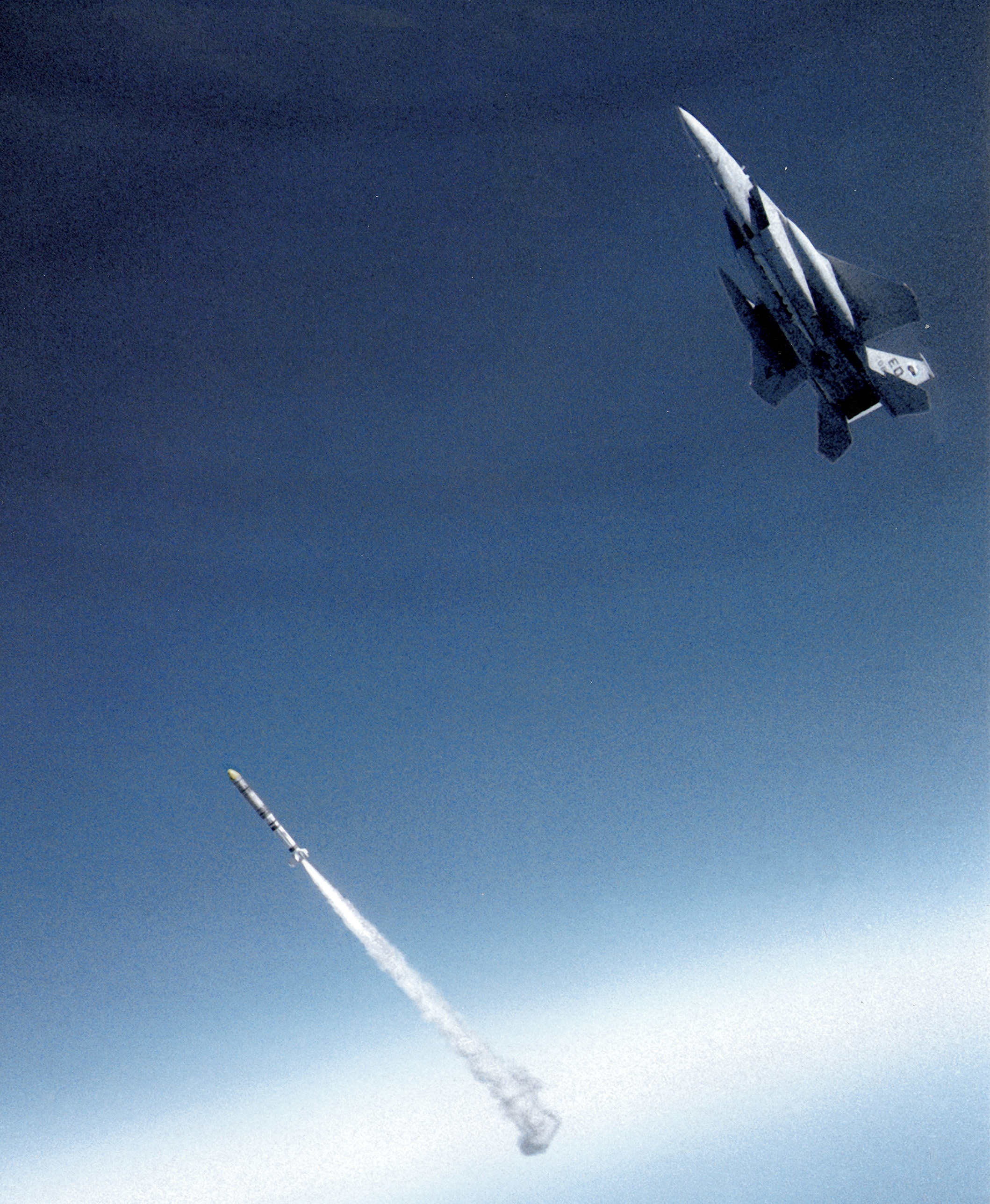
In 1985, the F-15A Celestial Eagle captained by Wilbert Pearson launched an ASM-135 ASAT anti-satellite missile, destroying Solwind in space.

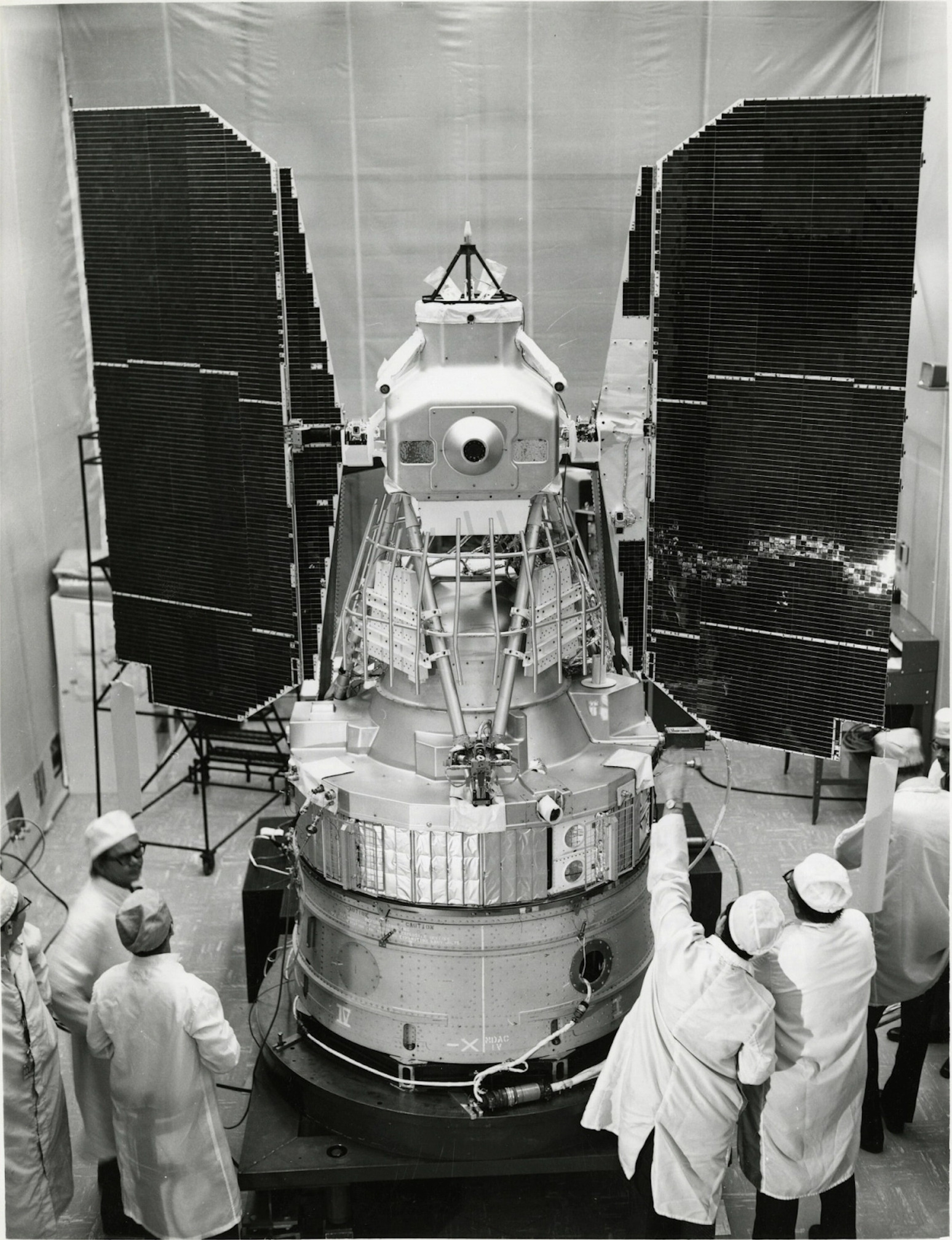
Landsat 1 with solar panels deployed after tests at GE Aerospace.

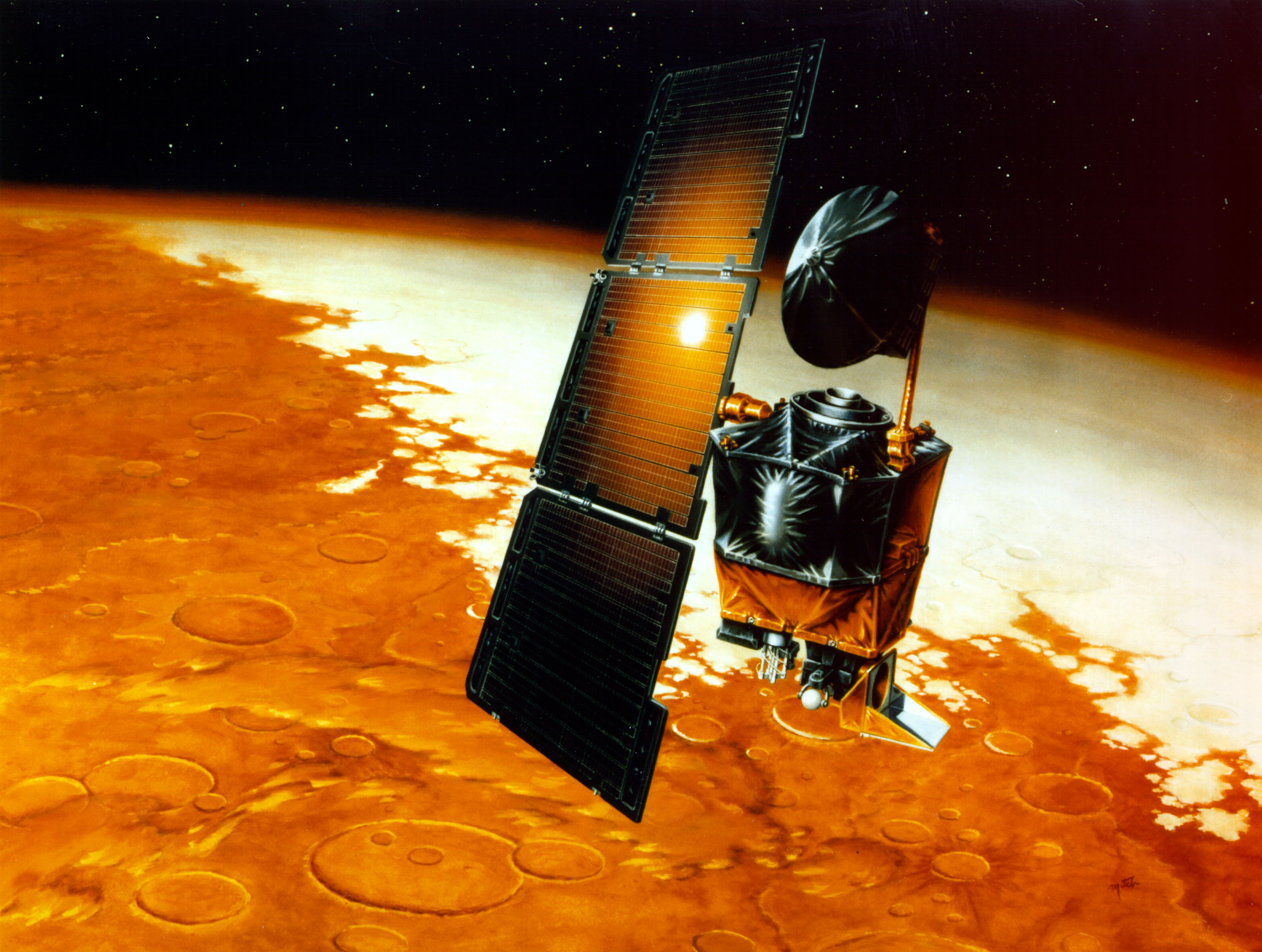
Mars Climate Orbiter artists depiction above Mars.

- Destroyed satellite milestones
  - 2007 Chinese anti-satellite missile test – Largest field of space debris in history
  - 2009 satellite collision – First hypervelocity spacecraft collision
  - Iridium 33 – Communications satellite operated by Iridium Communications
  - Kosmos 1408 – Soviet artificial satellite destroyed by an ASAT missile
  - Kosmos 2251 – Defunct Russian military communications satellite, operational from 1993 to 1995
  - Microsat-R – India earth-observing satellite
  - Mission Shakti – First Indian anti-satellite weapon test
  - Operation Burnt Frost – 2008 military operation to destroy a non-functioning U.S. satellite
  - Solwind – Artificial satellite, US Department of Defense
  - USA-193 – U.S. military satellite (2006–2008)
- Early Cold War satellites
  - CORONA (satellite) – American reconnaissance satellites (1959–1972)
  - Discoverer 1 – American reconnaissance satellite launched in 1959; failed to achieve orbit
  - Discoverer 14 – American reconnaissance satellite
  - Explorer 6 – NASA satellite of the Explorer program
  - Luna 1 – Soviet spacecraft
  - SCORE – First ever communications satellite
  - Sputnik 1 – First artificial Earth satellite
  - Sputnik 2 – Second spacecraft launched into Earth orbit (1957)
  - TIROS-1 – 1960 weather satellite
  - Transit (satellite navigation system) – Satellite navigation system
  - Vanguard 2 – US Navy satellite launched in 1959
- Early communications satellites
  - Applications Technology Satellites – Series of experimental satellites launched by NASA
  - ATS-1 – Early geostationary communications and weather satellite, launched in 1966
  - Courier 1B – 1960 American communications satellite
  - Intelsat I – American commercial communications satellite launched in 1965
  - Project Echo – First passive communications satellite experiment
  - Echo II – First passive communications satellite experiment
  - Relay program – 1960s experimental communications satellites
  - SCORE – First ever communications satellite
  - Syncom – 1960s and 80s NASA program to develop communications satellites
  - Telstar 1 – Defunct Communications Satellite
- Early Earth observation satellites
  - CORONA (satellite) – American reconnaissance satellites (1959–1972)
  - Discoverer 14 – American reconnaissance satellite
  - European Remote-Sensing Satellite – European Space Agency Earth-observing satellite program
  - Explorer 6 – NASA satellite of the Explorer program
  - Landsat 1 – American earth observation satellite (1972–1978)
  - Nimbus 1 – Former U.S. meteorological satellite
  - Nimbus program – Second-generation U.S. robotic spacecraft
  - Seasat – American ocean observation satellite (1978)
  - Television Infrared Observation Satellite – Series of early American weather satellites
  - TIROS-1 – 1960 weather satellite
- Early navigation satellites
  - GPS satellite blocks – Generations of US navigation satellites
  - Timation – American satellites
  - Transit (satellite navigation system) – Satellite navigation system
- Early weather satellites
  - Applications Technology Satellites – Series of experimental satellites launched by NASA
  - GOES 1 – NOAA weather satellite
  - Nimbus 1 – Former U.S. meteorological satellite
  - Nimbus program – Second-generation U.S. robotic spacecraft
  - NOAA-1 – Weather satellite (1970–1971)
  - Synchronous Meteorological Satellite – Weather satellite program of the United States
  - Television Infrared Observation Satellite – Series of early American weather satellites
  - TIROS-1 – 1960 weather satellite
  - Tiros – Town and municipality in the state of Minas Gerais, Brazil
  - Weather satellite – Type of satellite designed to record the state of the Earth's atmosphere
- Failed or lost satellites
  - ADEOS II – Derelict Japanese Earth observation satellite
  - Envisat – ESA Earth observation satellite (2002–2012)
  - Fobos-Grunt – 2011 Russian attempted sample-return mission to the Martian moon Phobos
  - Galaxy 15 – American telecommunications satellite
  - Glory (satellite) – Failed NASA satellite mission
  - Hitomi (satellite) – Failed Japanese X-ray astronomy satellite
  - Intelsat 708 – Chinese failed satellite launch in 1996
  - Kosmos 954 – Reconnaissance satellite of Soviet Union
  - Mars Climate Orbiter – Failed NASA mission to Mars (1998–1999)
  - NOAA-13 – American weather satellite that failed shortly after launch
  - Orbiting Carbon Observatory – Failed NASA climate satellite
- Long-lived satellites
  - AMSAT-OSCAR 7 – 1974 amateur radio satellite
  - Explorer 7 – Seventh satellite of the Explorer program
  - Hubble Space Telescope – NASA/ESA space telescope launched in 1990
  - International Space Station – Modular space station in low Earth orbit
  - LAGEOS – NASA scientific research satellites
  - Landsat 5 – American earth observation satellite (1984–2013)
  - Lincoln Calibration Sphere 1 – Radar calibration satellite

==== Major space observatories ====
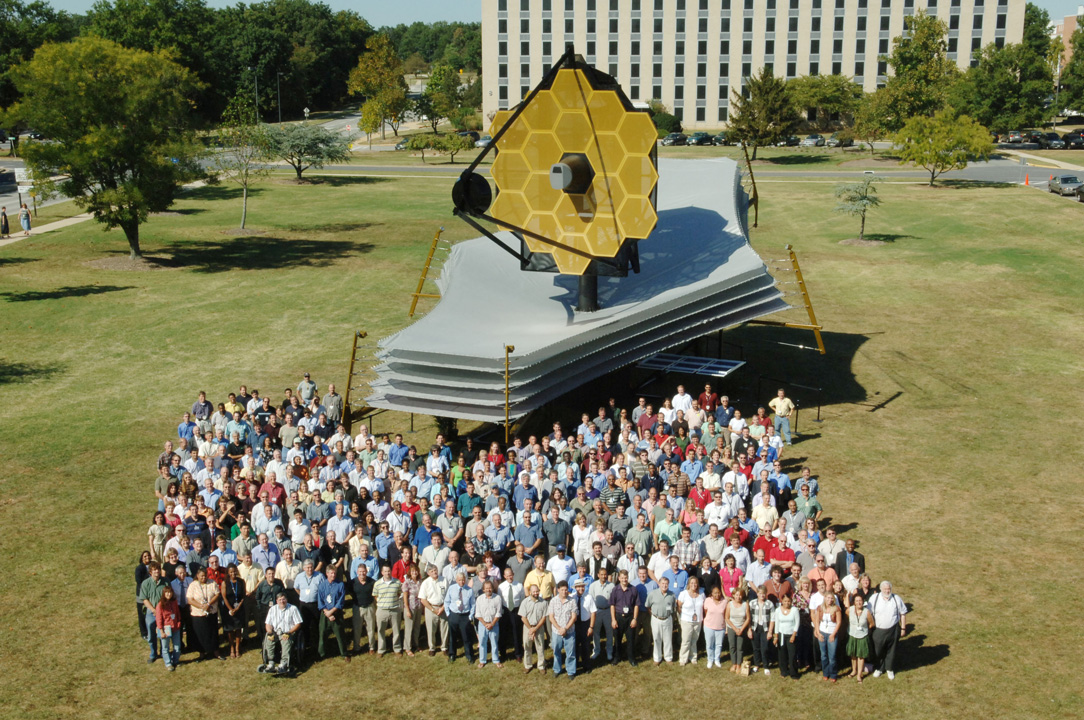
Early full-scale James Webb Space Telescope model on display at NASA Goddard Space Flight Center in 2005.

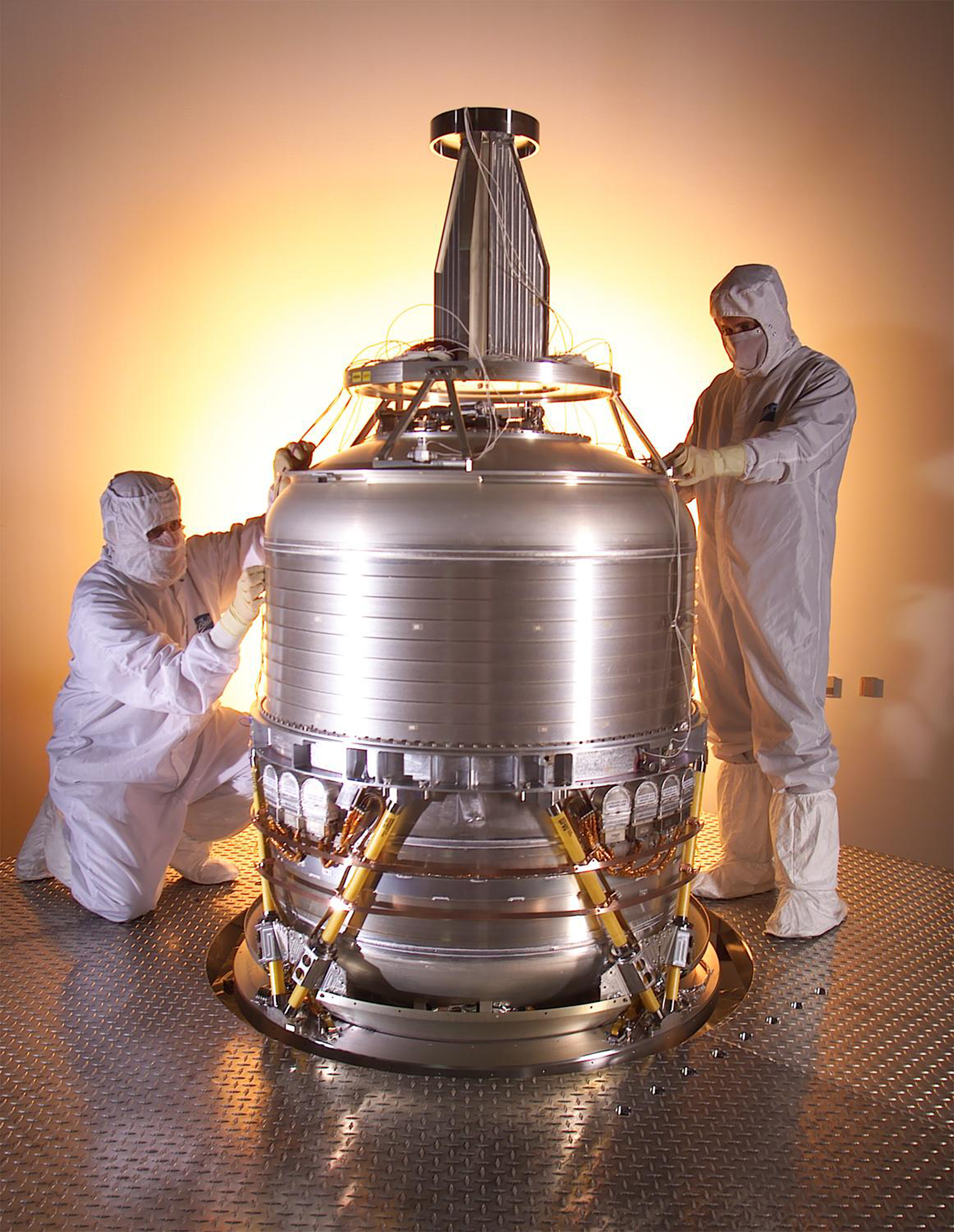
Lab work on the Spitzer Space Telescope before launch.

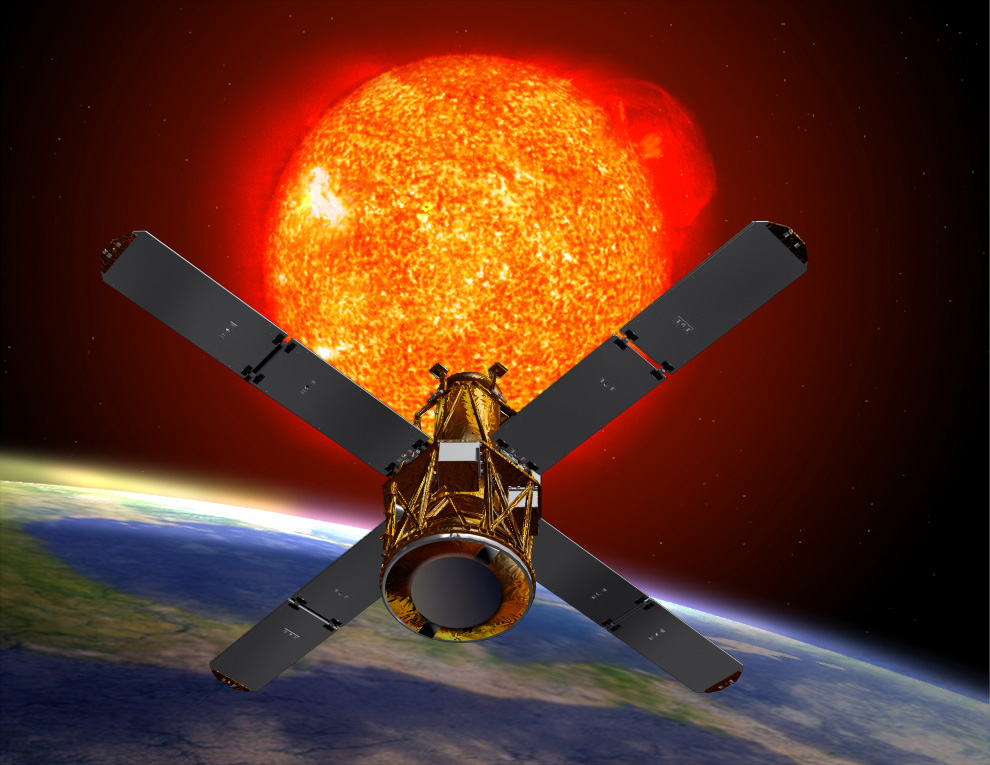
Depiction of the Reuven Ramaty High Energy Solar Spectroscopic Imager at the sun.

- Major cosmic background observatories
  - Cosmic Background Explorer – NASA satellite of the Explorer program
  - Cosmic microwave background – Trace radiation from the early universe
  - List of cosmic microwave background experiments
  - LiteBIRD – Planned Japanese small space observatory
  - Planck (spacecraft) – Space observatory
  - RELIKT-1 – Soviet cosmic microwave background experiment on the Prognoz 9 satellite
  - Wilkinson Microwave Anisotropy Probe – NASA satellite of the Explorer program
- Major gamma-ray observatories
  - AGILE (satellite) – X-ray and gamma ray astronomical satellite
  - BeppoSAX – Italian-Dutch satellite used for X-ray astronomy
  - Compton Gamma Ray Observatory – NASA space observatory designed to detect X-rays and gamma rays (1991–2000)
  - Cos-B – European space mission
  - Fermi Gamma-ray Space Telescope – Space telescope for gamma-ray astronomy launched in 2008
  - Gamma (satellite) – Soviet gamma ray telescope
  - Gamma-ray astronomy – Observational astronomy performed with gamma rays
  - High Energy Astronomy Observatory 3 – Space observatory
  - INTEGRAL – European space telescope for observing gamma rays
  - Neil Gehrels Swift Observatory – NASA satellite of the Explorer program
  - Small Astronomy Satellite 2 – Gamma ray telescope
- Major infrared observatories
  - Akari (satellite) – Infrared astronomy satellite developed by Japan Aerospace Exploration Agency
  - Euclid (space telescope) – European visible and near-infrared space observatory, launched in 2023
  - Herschel Space Observatory – ESA space telescope in service 2009–2013
  - Infrared astronomy – Observation of infrared wavelengths
  - Infrared Space Observatory – Orbital satellite telescope
  - IRAS – Infrared space observatory
  - James Webb Space Telescope – NASA/ESA/CSA space telescope launched in 2021
  - Midcourse Space Experiment – Space telescope
  - Nancy Grace Roman Space Telescope – NASA infrared space telescope
  - Spitzer Space Telescope – NASA infrared space telescope (2003–2020)
  - Wide-field Infrared Survey Explorer – NASA satellite of the Explorer program
- Major optical and ultraviolet observatories
  - AstroSat – Space observatory
  - Far Ultraviolet Spectroscopic Explorer – NASA satellite of the Explorer program (1999–2007)
  - GALEX – NASA UV space telescope of the Explorer program, operated 2003–2013
  - Hubble Space Telescope – NASA/ESA space telescope launched in 1990
  - International Ultraviolet Explorer – Astronomical observatory satellite
  - Orbiting Astronomical Observatory 2 – Space telescope launched on 7 December 1968
  - Orbiting Astronomical Observatory 3 – Space telescope intended for ultraviolet and X-ray observation
  - Ultraviolet astronomy – Observation of electromagnetic radiation at ultraviolet wavelengths
- Major solar observatories
  - Hinode (satellite) – Japanese satellite
  - Interface Region Imaging Spectrograph – NASA satellite of the Explorer program
  - Parker Solar Probe – NASA probe of the Sun's outer corona
  - Reuven Ramaty High Energy Solar Spectroscopic Imager – NASA satellite of the Explorer program
  - Solar and Heliospheric Observatory – European space observatory
  - Solar Dynamics Observatory – NASA mission, launched in 2010 to GSO
  - Solar Orbiter – European space-based solar observatory
  - Solar telescope – Telescope used to observe the Sun
  - STEREO – Solar observation mission (2006–present)
  - TRACE – NASA satellite of the Explorer program
  - Yohkoh – Japanese spacecraft
- Major X-ray observatories
  - Chandra X-ray Observatory – NASA space telescope launched in 1999
  - Einstein Observatory – X-ray telescope space observatory
  - Hitomi (satellite) – Failed Japanese X-ray astronomy satellite
  - Neutron Star Interior Composition Explorer – NASA telescope on International Space Station
  - NuSTAR – NASA X-ray space telescope of the Explorer program
  - Rossi X-ray Timing Explorer – NASA satellite of the Explorer program
  - Spektr-RG – Russian–German observatory satellite
  - Suzaku (satellite)
  - Uhuru (satellite) – NASA X-ray astronomy satellite (1970–1973, decay 1979)
  - XMM-Newton – X-ray space observatory
  - X-ray astronomy – Branch of astronomy that uses X-ray observation
  - X-ray telescope – Telescope designed to observe remote objects by detecting X-rays

=== Types of satellites ===
Artificial satellites can be grouped by mission purpose, operator or country of origin, operational status, size, and spacecraft design. Mission-purpose groupings include communications, Earth observation, navigation and positioning, scientific, weather, reconnaissance, amateur, educational, servicing, passive, and technology-demonstration satellites. Other useful groupings describe lifecycle or design, including active, future, inactive, past, failed, derelict, reentered, small, CubeSat, modular, and formation-flying spacecraft.

==== By mission ====
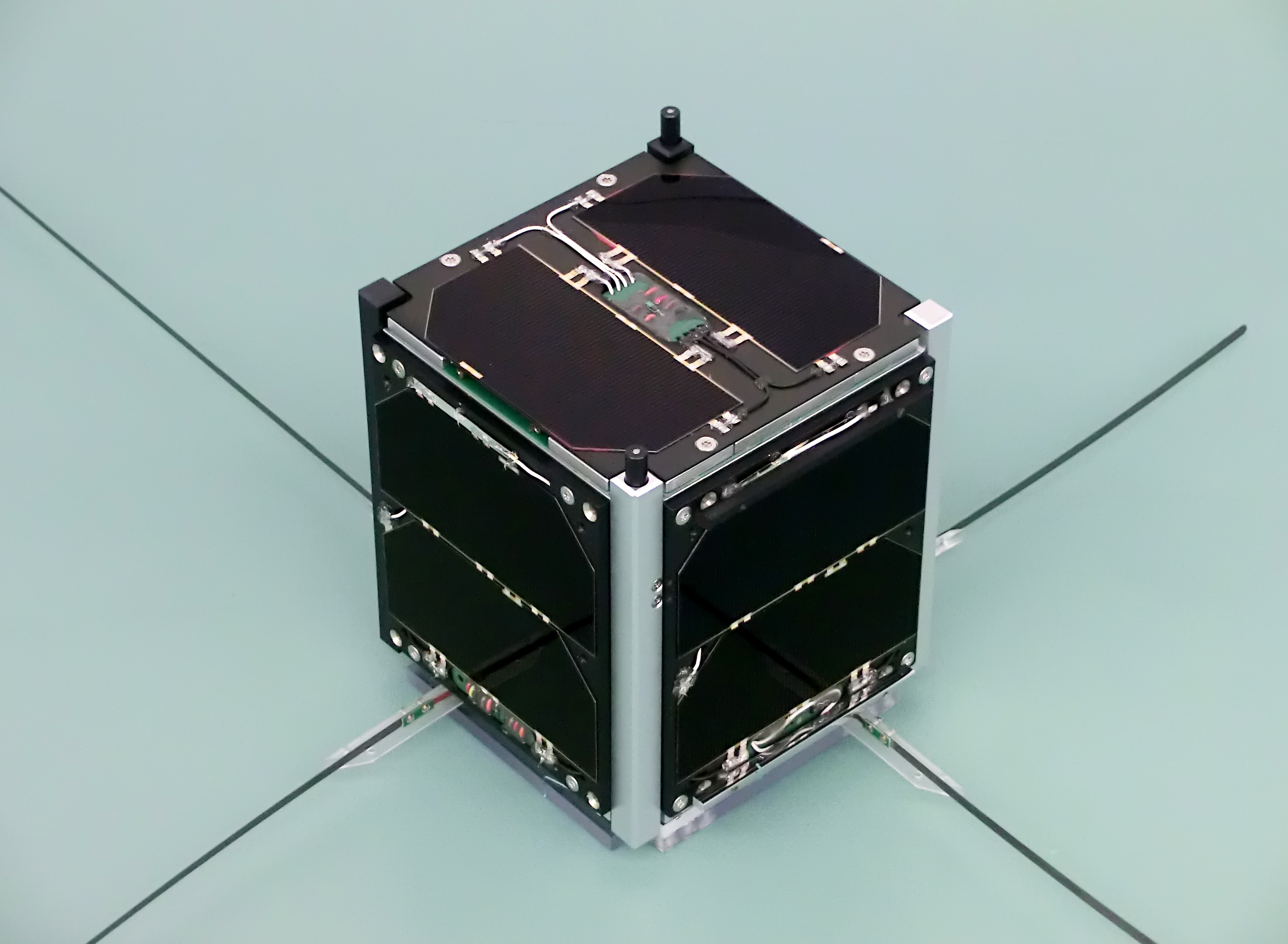
FUNcube-1 is an educational CubeSat satellite launched to teach young people about radio, space, physics and electronics.

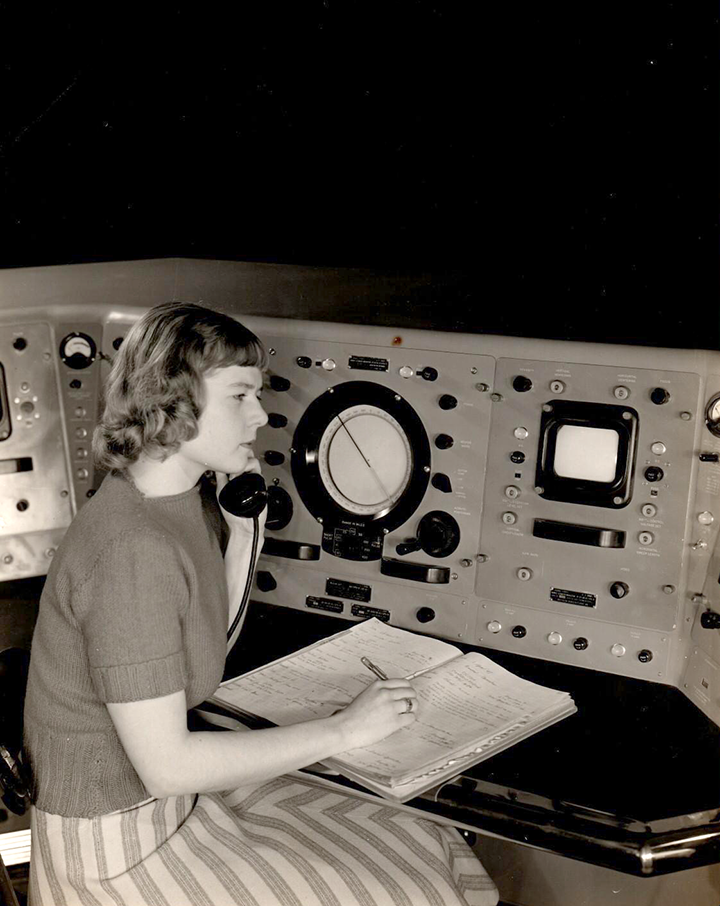
Virginia Norwood, "The Mother of Landsat", designed the Multispectral Scanner.

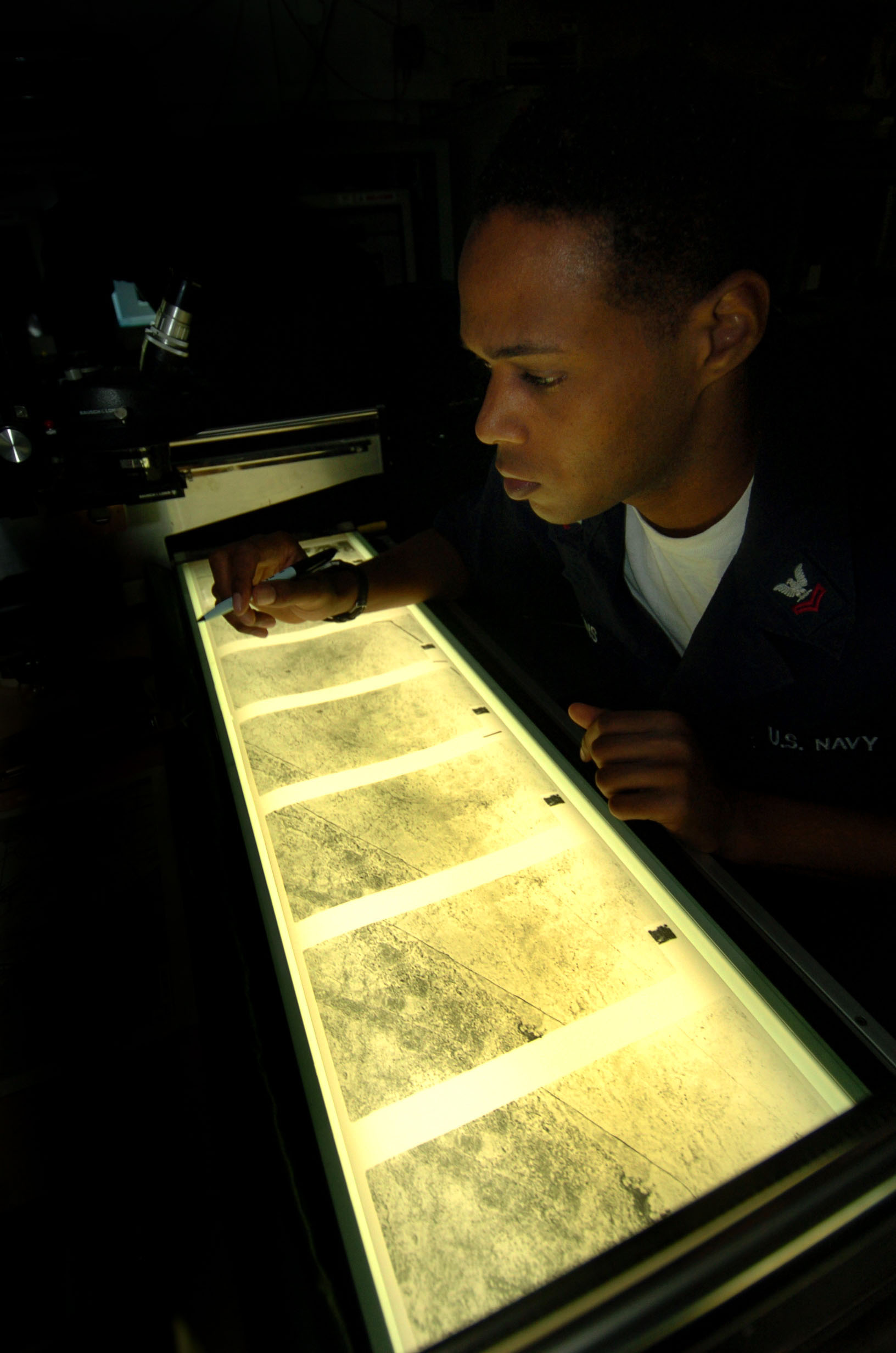
US Navy sailor examining reconnaissance imagery on a light table, 2004.

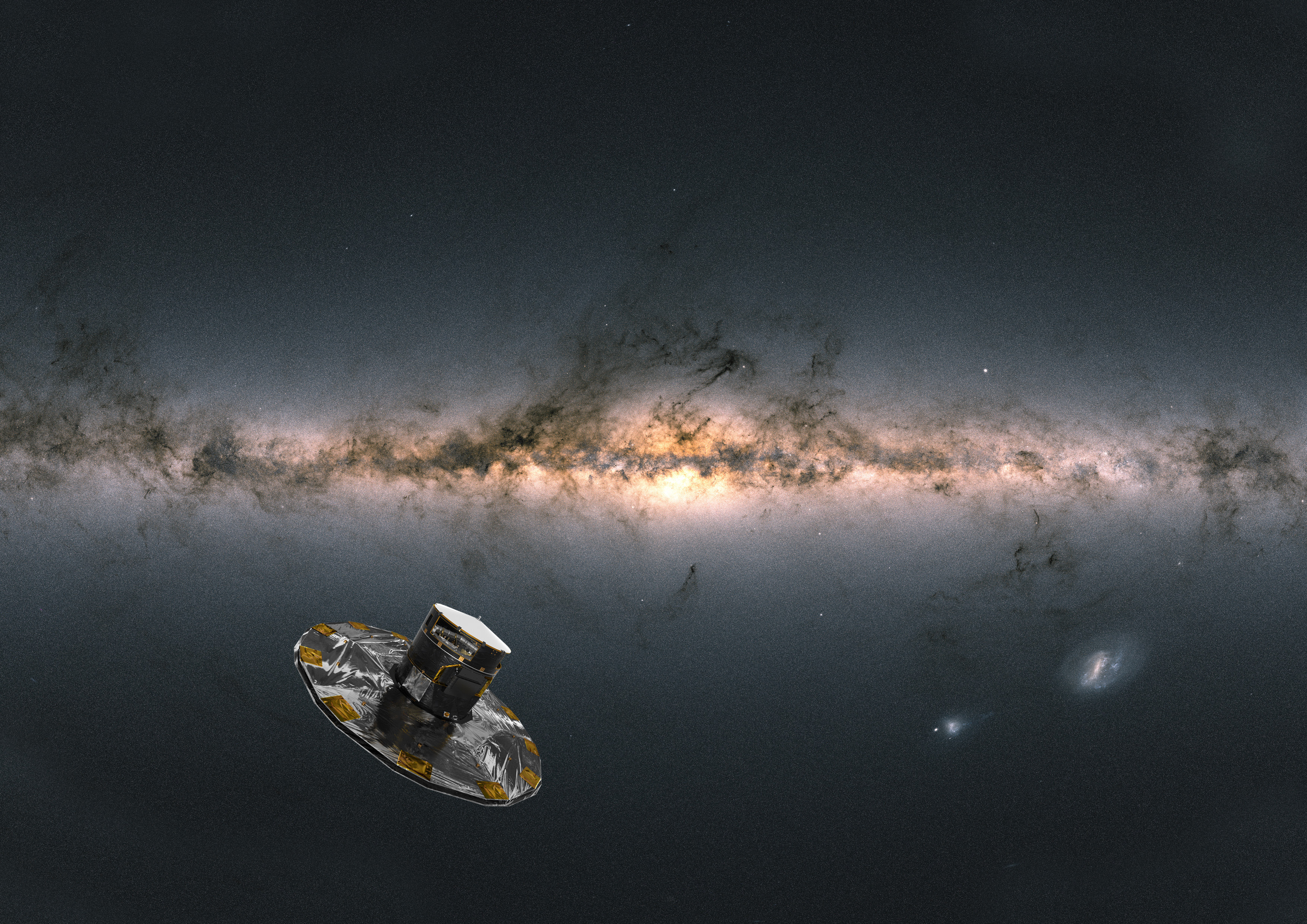
Artist rendering of ESA's Gaia satellite observing the Milky Way. The background sky image was compiled from data of more than 1.8 billion stars.

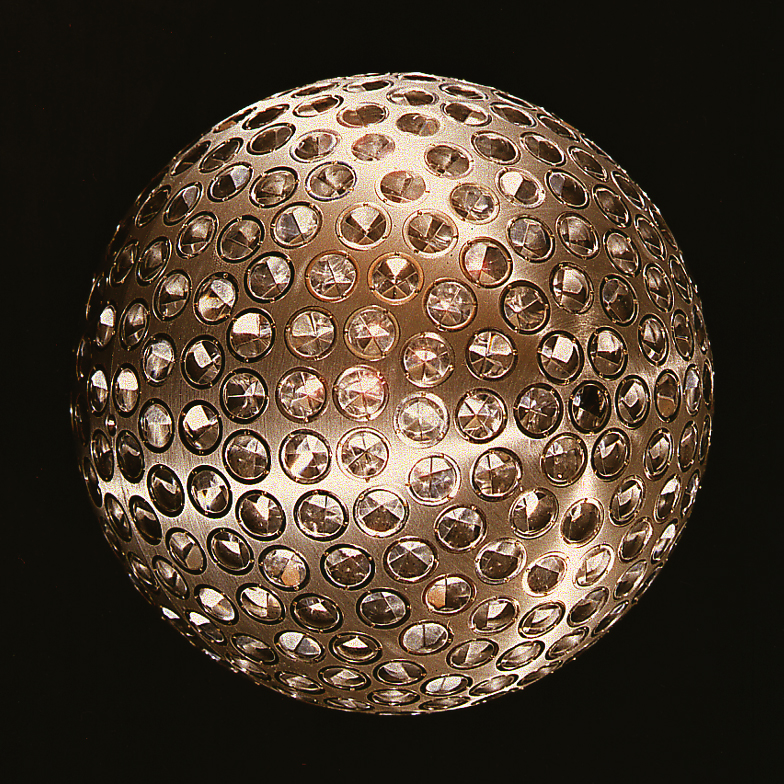
LAGEOS are satellites designed to provide orbital laser ranging benchmarks for geodynamical studies of Earth.

- Amateur radio satellites
  - Amateur radio satellite – Type of satellite that transmits over amateur radio frequencies
  - AMSAT – Amateur radio satellite organizations
    - AMSAT-OSCAR 6
    - AMSAT-OSCAR 7 – 1974 amateur radio satellite
    - AMSAT-OSCAR 10 – Star-shaped German AMSAT micro-satellite
    - AMSAT-OSCAR 51
  - FUNcube-1 – Educational CubeSat satellite
  - OSCAR (satellite) – Designation of amateur radio satellites
    - OSCAR 1 – Amateur radio satellite
    - UoSAT-1 – British amateur radio satellite
    - UoSAT-2 – British satellite
- Biosatellites
  - Bion (satellite) – Soviet and Russian spacecraft aimed at biological experiments in space
  - Bion-M No.1 – Russian space mission
  - BioSentinel – US experimental astrobiology research satellite
  - Biosatellite – Artificial satellite designed to carry plants or animals in outer space
  - Biosatellite program – Series of 3 NASA satellites to assess the effects of spaceflight on living organisms
  - EuCROPIS – German satellite
  - GeneSat-1 – NASA cubesat
  - Korabl-Sputnik 2 – Soviet artificial satellite launched in 1960
  - Sputnik 2 – Second spacecraft launched into Earth orbit (1957)
- Communications satellites
  - Broadcasting-satellite service
  - Eutelsat OneWeb – Global communications company
  - Fixed-satellite service – Telecommunication subcategory
  - Globalstar – Global satellite telecommunications company
  - Inmarsat – British satellite communications company
  - Intelsat – Luxembourgish communications satellite services provider
  - Iridium satellite constellation – Satellite constellation providing voice and data coverage
  - Mobile satellite service – Service for mobile phones to communicate with satellites
  - Satellite Internet access – Satellite-provided Internet
  - Satellite phone – Type of mobile phone
  - Satellite radio – Broadcasting-satellite service
  - Satellite television – Broadcasting of television using artificial satellites
  - Starlink – SpaceX satellite Internet constellation
- Earth observation satellites
  - Aqua (satellite) – NASA scientific research satellite (2002–present)
  - Disaster Monitoring Constellation – Satellite constellation
  - Envisat – ESA Earth observation satellite (2002–2012)
  - GeoEye-1 – Commercial Earth observation satellite
  - Ikonos – Commercial Earth observation satellite
  - Landsat program – American network of Earth-observing satellites for international research purposes
  - Planet Labs – American space technology company
  - RADARSAT
  - Remote sensing – Obtaining information through non-contact sensors
  - Satellite imagery – Images taken from an artificial satellite
  - Sentinel-1 – Earth observation satellite
  - Sentinel-2 – Earth observation mission
  - SPOT (satellite) – Commercial Earth-imaging satellite system operated by the French space agency CNES
  - Terra (satellite) – NASA climate research satellite (1999–present)
- Navigation satellites
  - BeiDou – Chinese global navigation satellite system
  - European Geostationary Navigation Overlay Service – System that enhances the accuracy of GPS receivers
  - Galileo (satellite navigation system) – European global navigation satellite system
  - Global Positioning System – American satellite-based radio navigation service
  - GLONASS – Russian global navigation satellite system
  - GNSS augmentation – Method of improving a navigation system
  - GPS satellite blocks – Generations of US navigation satellites
  - Indian Regional Navigation Satellite System – Satellite navigation system
  - Quasi-Zenith Satellite System – Japanese regional navigation satellite system
  - Wide Area Augmentation System – System that enhances the accuracy of GPS receivers
- Passive satellites
  - LAGEOS – NASA scientific research satellites
  - Lincoln Calibration Sphere 1 – Radar calibration satellite
  - List of passive satellites
  - PAGEOS – Passive geodetic satellite launched by NASA in 1966
  - Project Echo – First passive communications satellite experiment
  - STARSHINE (satellite) – Series of satellites
- Reconnaissance satellite types
  - CORONA (satellite) – American reconnaissance satellites (1959–1972)
  - COSMO-SkyMed – Italian radar observation satellite system
  - Imagery intelligence – Intelligence gathered by means of imagery
  - KH-7 Gambit – Series of United States reconnaissance satellites
  - KH-8 Gambit 3 – Series of United States reconnaissance satellites
  - KH-9 Hexagon – American family of spy satellites
  - KH-11 KENNEN – Type of American spy satellite
  - Lacrosse (satellite) – Series of American terrestrial radar imaging reconnaissance satellites
  - Military satellite – Artificial satellite used for military purposes
  - Naval Ocean Surveillance System – Series of signals-intelligence satellites of the U.S. Navy
    - White Cloud – Series of signals-intelligence satellites of the U.S. Navy
  - Ofeq – Israeli reconnaissance satellites
  - Reconnaissance satellite – Satellite that covertly collects data for intelligence or military applications
  - SAR-Lupe – German military reconnaissance satellite system
  - Signals intelligence – Intelligence-gathering by interception of signals
  - TerraSAR-X – German Earth observation satellite
  - Yaogan – Chinese military reconnaissance satellite program
- Scientific satellites
  - Advanced Composition Explorer – NASA satellite of the Explorer program, at SE-L1 from 1997
  - Cluster II (spacecraft) – European Space Agency space mission
  - Cosmic Background Explorer – NASA satellite of the Explorer program
  - Explorers Program – Ongoing NASA space exploration program
  - Geotail – NASA/ISAS spacecraft
  - Interstellar Boundary Explorer – NASA satellite of the Explorer program
  - Magnetospheric Multiscale Mission – Four NASA robots studying Earth's magnetosphere (2015–present)
  - Planck (spacecraft) – Space observatory
  - Satellite – Objects intentionally placed into orbit
  - THEMIS – NASA satellite of the Explorer program
  - Van Allen Probes – NASA Earth magnetosphere investigator satellites
  - Wilkinson Microwave Anisotropy Probe – NASA satellite of the Explorer program
- Service satellites
  - Astroscale – Orbital debris removal company
  - ClearSpace-1 – Planned European mission to demonstrate space debris removal
  - Mission Extension Vehicle – Spacecraft concept
  - On-orbit satellite servicing – Refueling, repairing, or boosting the orbit of satellites
  - Orbital Express – US project to autonomously service satellites in orbit ~2007
  - OSAM-1 – NASA Spacecraft
  - RemoveDEBRIS – Project to demonstrate various space debris removal technologies
  - Repair Satellite Prototype – 2018 microsatellite with two robotic arms
  - Robotic Refueling Mission
  - Robotic Servicing of Geosynchronous Satellites program – Satellite-servicing project
  - Satellite refuelling – Operation of replenishing
  - Solar Maximum Mission – NASA solar observatory (1980–1989)
- Space telescope satellites
  - Chandra X-ray Observatory – NASA space telescope launched in 1999
  - Compton Gamma Ray Observatory – NASA space observatory designed to detect X-rays and gamma rays (1991–2000)
  - Fermi Gamma-ray Space Telescope – Space telescope for gamma-ray astronomy launched in 2008
  - Gaia (spacecraft) – European optical space observatory for astrometry
  - Herschel Space Observatory – ESA space telescope in service 2009–2013
  - Hipparcos – European Space Agency scientific satellite
  - Hubble Space Telescope – NASA/ESA space telescope launched in 1990
  - Infrared Space Observatory – Orbital satellite telescope
  - James Webb Space Telescope – NASA/ESA/CSA space telescope launched in 2021
  - List of space telescopes
  - NuSTAR – NASA X-ray space telescope of the Explorer program
  - Space telescope – Instrument in space to study astronomical objects
  - Spitzer Space Telescope – NASA infrared space telescope (2003–2020)
  - XMM-Newton – X-ray space observatory
- Student satellites
  - Aalto-1 – Finnish research nanosatellite
  - AAU CubeSat – CubeSat built and operated by Aalborg University, Denmark
    - AAUSat-2 – CubeSat built and operated by Aalborg University, Denmark
    - AAUSat-3 – CubeSat built and operated by Aalborg University, Denmark
  - ArduSat – Arduino-based CubeSat science project
  - BRICSat-2 – Experimental amateur radio satellite
  - BRICSat-P – United States technology demonstration and amateur radio cubesat
  - CanSat – Sounding rocket payload used to teach space technology
  - Cornell University Satellite – American technology demonstration satellite
  - Delfi-C3 – Dutch mini-satellite
  - Delfi-n3Xt – Dutch nanosatellite
  - EQUiSat
  - KickSat – Citizen science project
  - KySat-1 – American satellite
  - List of CubeSats
  - Quakesat – Earth Observation nanosatellite
  - Student Space Exploration & Technology Initiative
- Target satellites
  - Ariane Passenger Payload Experiment – Communication satellite
  - DART (satellite) – NASA Autonomous Rendezvous demo 2005
  - Inflatable Antenna Experiment
  - LAGEOS – NASA scientific research satellites
  - Lincoln Calibration Sphere 1 – Radar calibration satellite
  - Long Duration Exposure Facility – NASA materials science satellite
  - MiTEx – Microsatellite-based technology demonstration mission of the United States
  - Passive Inspection CubeSat – Technology demonstration cubesat
  - Shuttle pallet satellite – Part of NASA's Space Shuttle
  - XSS-10 – Micro-spacecraft developed by U.S. Air Force
- Technology demonstration satellites
  - ACTS Gigabit Satellite Network – Prototype communications system
  - Deep Space 1 – NASA flyby mission to asteroid Braille and Comet Borrelly (1998–2001)
  - Inflatable Antenna Experiment
  - LightSail – LEO solar sailing demo project
  - NanoSail-D – Satellite designed to test the concept of solar sails that deployed unsuccessfully
  - PharmaSat
  - PROBA – European Space Agency satellite
    - PROBA-2 – European Space Agency satellite
    - PROBA-V – European Space Agency satellite
  - SNAP-1
  - STS-51 – 1993 American crewed spaceflight
  - Technology demonstration – Showcasing an idea for new technology
  - Technology for Autonomous Operational Survivability
  - TRACE – NASA satellite of the Explorer program
- Weather satellites
  - Arctic Weather Satellite – European weather satellite
  - Defense Meteorological Satellite Program – United States Department of Defense weather monitoring program
  - Geostationary Operational Environmental Satellite – US weather satellite series
  - Himawari (satellites) – Geostationary meteorological satellite
  - List of GOES satellites
  - List of NOAA satellites
  - Meteosat – Series of european weather satellites
  - MetOp – Series of European meteorological satellites
  - NOAA-20 – American weather satellite
  - Suomi NPP – American Earth weather satellite (2011–present)
  - Television Infrared Observation Satellite – Series of early American weather satellites
  - Tiros – Town and municipality in the state of Minas Gerais, Brazil
  - Weather satellite – Type of satellite designed to record the state of the Earth's atmosphere

==== By operational status ====
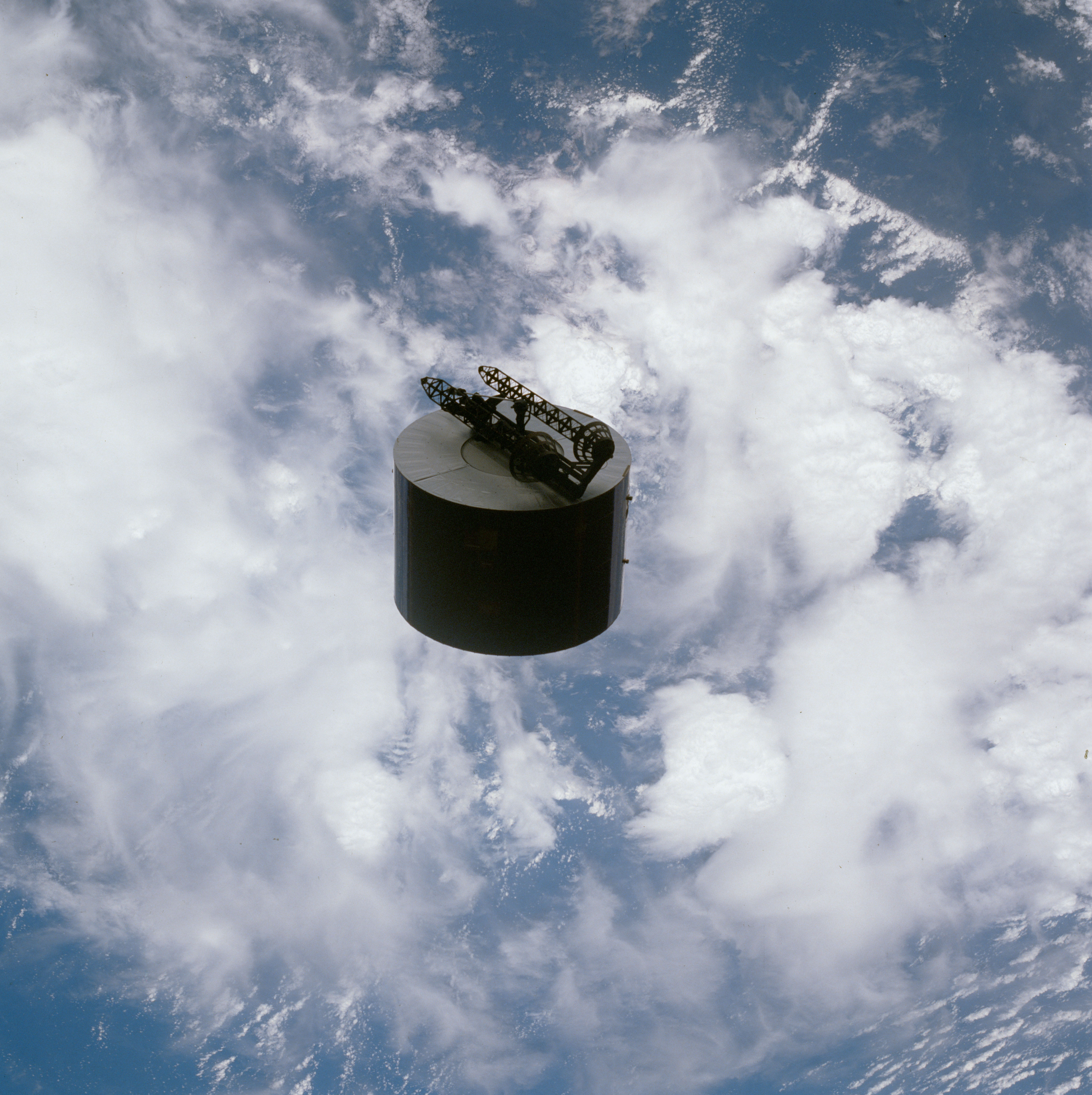
Leasat F3 after its deployment from the space shuttle Discovery during mission STS-51-D.

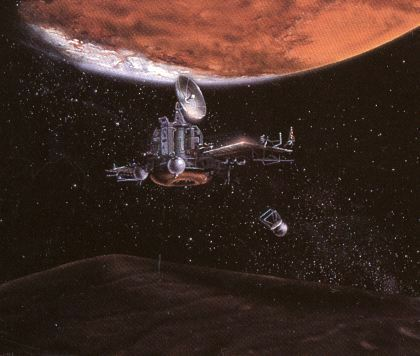
Illustration of the Phobos 1 spacecraft.

- Cancelled satellites
  - AMOS-8 (satellite) – AMOS communications satellite
  - Arkyd-100 – Former American asteroid mining company
  - Enhanced Imaging System – American reconnaissance satellite program
  - Future Imagery Architecture – American spy satellite program
- Decommissioned satellites
  - CORONA (satellite) – American reconnaissance satellites (1959–1972)
  - Envisat – ESA Earth observation satellite (2002–2012)
  - Intelsat I – American commercial communications satellite launched in 1965
  - Nimbus 1 – Former U.S. meteorological satellite
  - Nimbus 7 – Former U.S. meteorological satellite
  - Syncom 1 – 1960s and 80s NASA program to develop communications satellites
  - Syncom 2 – 1960s and 80s NASA program to develop communications satellites
  - Syncom 3 – 1960s and 80s NASA program to develop communications satellites
  - Telstar 1 – Defunct Communications Satellite
  - Vanguard 1 upper stage – American satellite launched in 1958; oldest manmade object in Earth orbit
- Derelict satellites
  - AMC-9
  - AMSAT-OSCAR 7 – 1974 amateur radio satellite
  - Derelict satellite – Pollution around Earth by defunct artificial objects
  - Derelict spacecraft – Pollution around Earth by defunct artificial objects
  - Galaxy 15 – American telecommunications satellite
  - Humanity Star – Miniaturized passive satellite
  - LES-1 – American communications satellite
  - Minotaur V Flight 1, fifth stage – Former NASA Lunar mission
  - Minotaur V Flight 1, fourth stage – Former NASA Lunar mission
  - Orbital Reflector – 2018 sculpture and passive satellite by Trevor Paglen
  - SDS-1 – Japanese demonstration spacecraft
  - SNAP-10A – Experimental nuclear-powered US Air Force satellite
  - Zombie satellite – Satellite that begins communicating again after an extended period of inactivity
- Destroyed satellites
  - 2007 Chinese anti-satellite missile test – Largest field of space debris in history
  - Kosmos 954 – Reconnaissance satellite of Soviet Union
  - Kosmos 1408 – Soviet artificial satellite destroyed by an ASAT missile
  - Operation Burnt Frost – 2008 military operation to destroy a non-functioning U.S. satellite
- Failed satellites
  - AMC-14 – Communications satellite
  - BSAT-2b – Japanese communications satellite
  - Mars Observer – Failed NASA orbiter mission to Mars (1992–1993)
  - NOAA-19 – American weather satellite (2009–2025)
  - NOAA-B – American weather satellite
  - Phobos 1 – Soviet mars probe
  - Phobos 2 – Soviet Mars moon probe (1988–1989)
  - Syncom 1 – 1960s and 80s NASA program to develop communications satellites
  - Zuma (satellite) – Classified United States government satellite
- Proposed satellites
  - CASTOR (spacecraft) – Proposed UV/blue-optical space observatory
  - Future Imagery Architecture – American spy satellite program
  - TOLIMAN – Telescope
  - TRISHNA – Planned joint Indo-French weather satellite
- Reentered satellites
  - Kosmos 954 – Reconnaissance satellite of Soviet Union
  - List of reentering space debris
  - Mir – Soviet/Russian space station (1986–2001)
  - Salyut 7 – Soviet space station (1982–1991)
  - Tiangong-1 – Chinese space station (2011–2018)
  - Upper Atmosphere Research Satellite – NASA-operated orbital observatory (1991–2011)

==== By origin ====
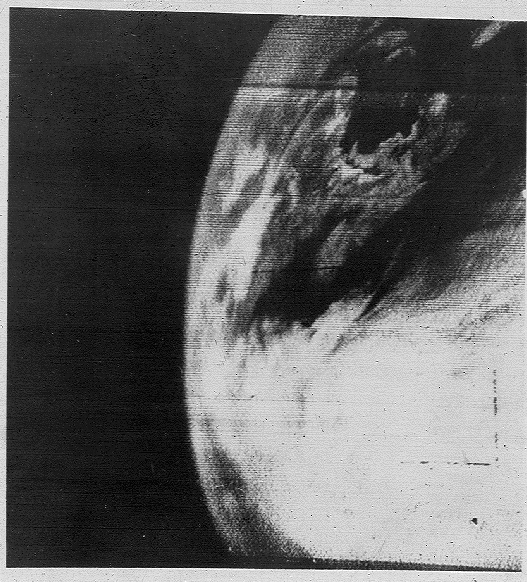
The first television image of Earth from space from the TIROS-1 weather satellite in 1960.

- Artificial satellites
  - Artificial satellite – Objects intentionally placed into orbit
  - Communications satellite – Artificial satellite that relays radio signals
  - List of first satellites by country – First artificial satellites launched by country or territory
  - Reconnaissance satellite – Satellite that covertly collects data for intelligence or military applications
  - Satellite – Objects intentionally placed into orbit
  - Satellite Catalog Number – NORAD satellite identifier
  - Small satellite – Satellites of low mass and size, usually under 1200 kg
  - Spacecraft – Vehicle or machine designed to fly in space
  - Sputnik 1 – First artificial Earth satellite
  - Technology demonstration – Showcasing an idea for new technology
  - Uncrewed spacecraft – Spacecraft without people on board
  - Weather satellite – Type of satellite designed to record the state of the Earth's atmosphere
- Captured satellites
  - 2020 SO – Space junk
  - 6Q0B44E – Object in high Earth orbit
  - Apollo 12 – Second crewed Moon landing
  - J002E3 – Designation of part of the Saturn V rocket
  - Lunar Prospector – Third mission of the Discovery program; polar orbital reconnaissance of the Moon
  - S-IVB – Third stage on the Saturn V and second stage on the Saturn IB
  - Space debris – Pollution around Earth by defunct artificial objects
  - Surveyor 2 – Failed lunar lander launched in 1966
  - Temporary satellite – Object captured by a planet for a while
  - WT1190F – Small temporary satellite of Earth that impacted in 2015
- Co-orbital satellites
  - A-train (satellite constellation) – Satellite constellation of three Earth observation satellites
  - Cluster II (spacecraft) – European Space Agency space mission
  - Eutelsat OneWeb – Global communications company
  - Formation flying – Flight of multiple objects in a coordinated shape or pattern
  - GRACE and GRACE-FO – Joint American-German space mission to map Earth's gravitational field
  - Iridium satellite constellation – Satellite constellation providing voice and data coverage
  - Magnetospheric Multiscale Mission – Four NASA robots studying Earth's magnetosphere (2015–present)
  - PROBA-3 – European Space Agency mission
  - Satellite constellation – Group of artificial satellites working together as a system
  - Satellite formation flying
  - Starlink – SpaceX satellite Internet constellation
  - TanDEM-X – German Earth observation satellite mission
  - TerraSAR-X – German Earth observation satellite
  - THEMIS – NASA satellite of the Explorer program
- Temporary satellites
  - 2020 SO – Space junk
  - 6Q0B44E – Object in high Earth orbit
  - J002E3 – Designation of part of the Saturn V rocket
  - List of reentering space debris
  - Space debris – Pollution around Earth by defunct artificial objects
  - Temporary satellite – Object captured by a planet for a while
  - WT1190F – Small temporary satellite of Earth that impacted in 2015

==== By size and design ====
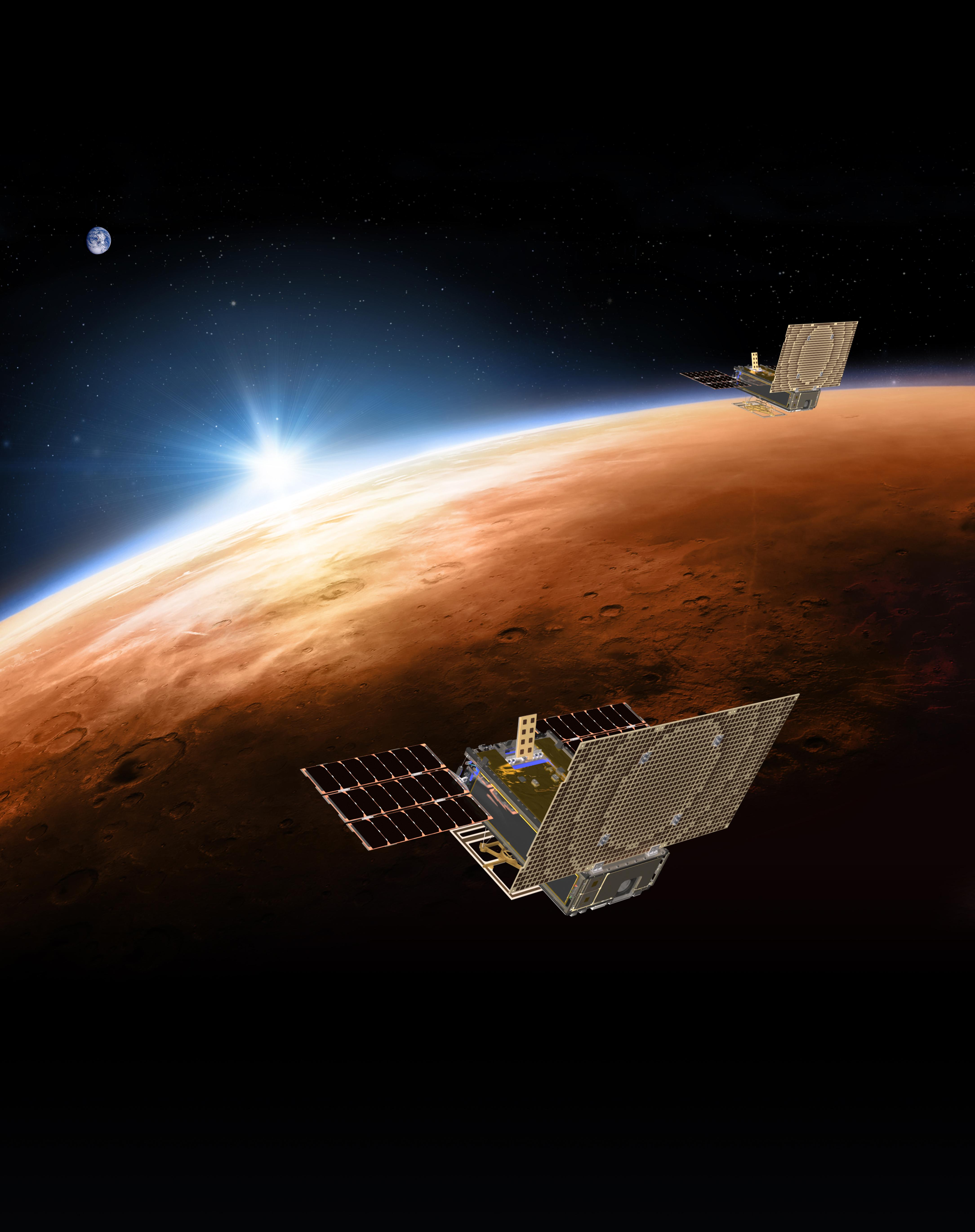
Mars Cube One was a Mars flyby mission launched 2018 alongside NASA's InSight Mars lander.

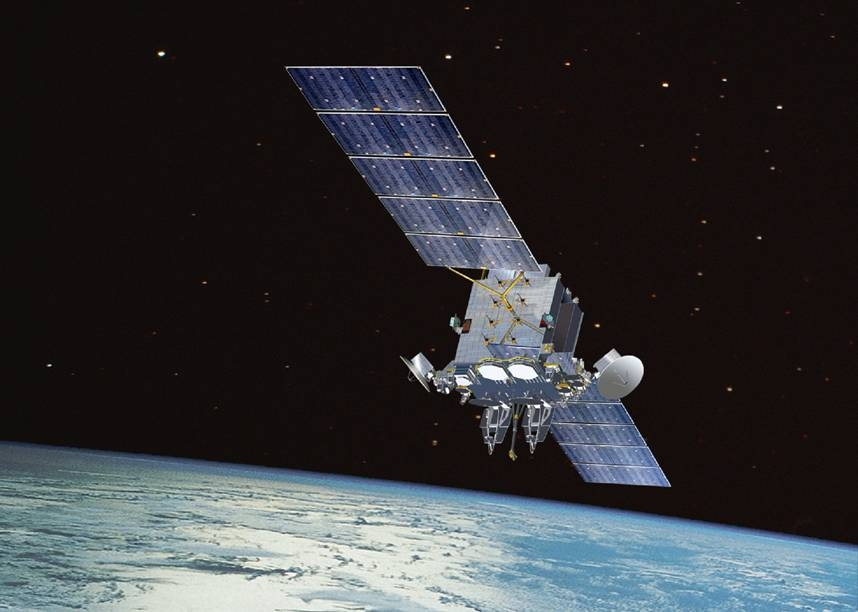
Advanced Extremely High Frequency (AEHF) is a constellation of communications satellites operated by the United States Space Force.

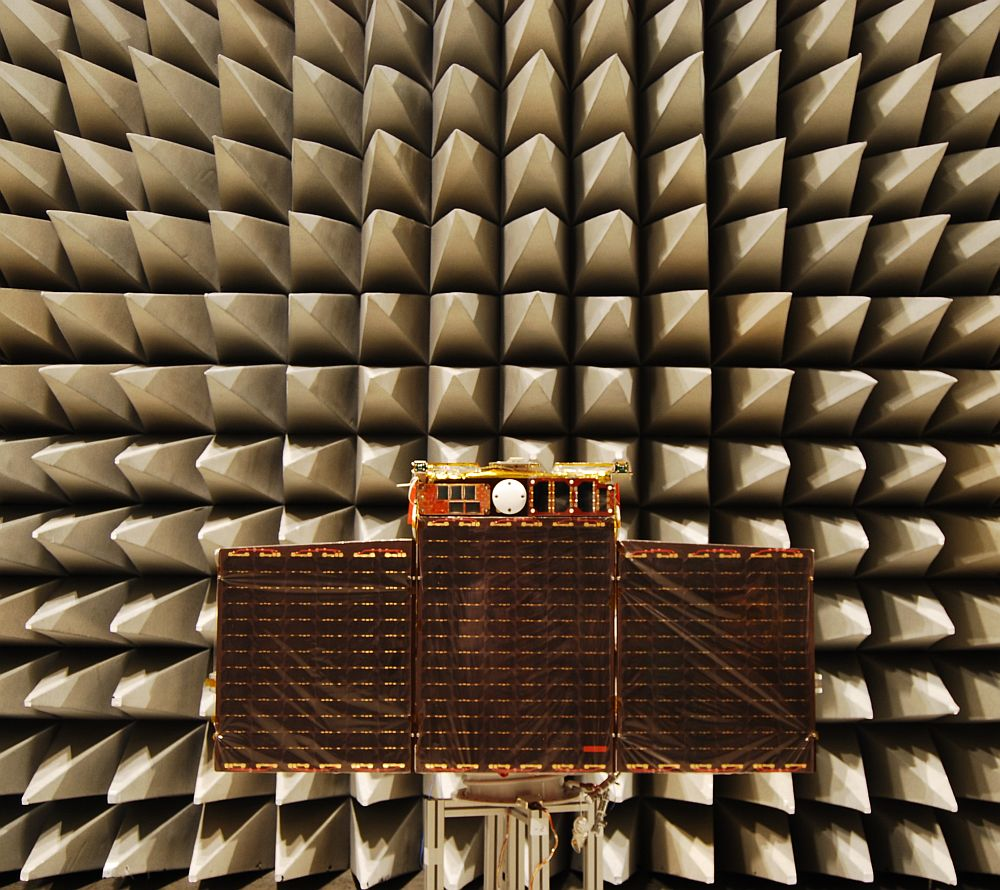
The German Aerospace Center's TET-1 microsatellite undergoing tests.

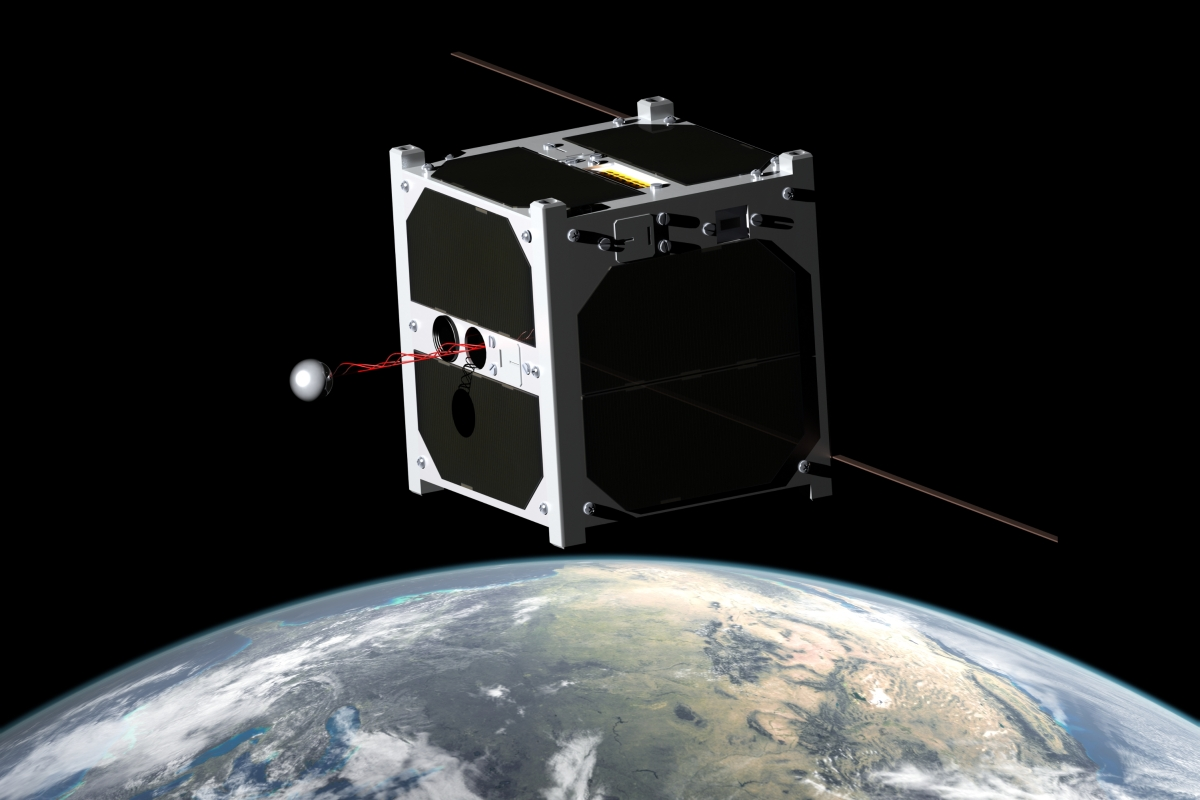
Artistic illustration of ESTCube-1, Estonia's first satellite.

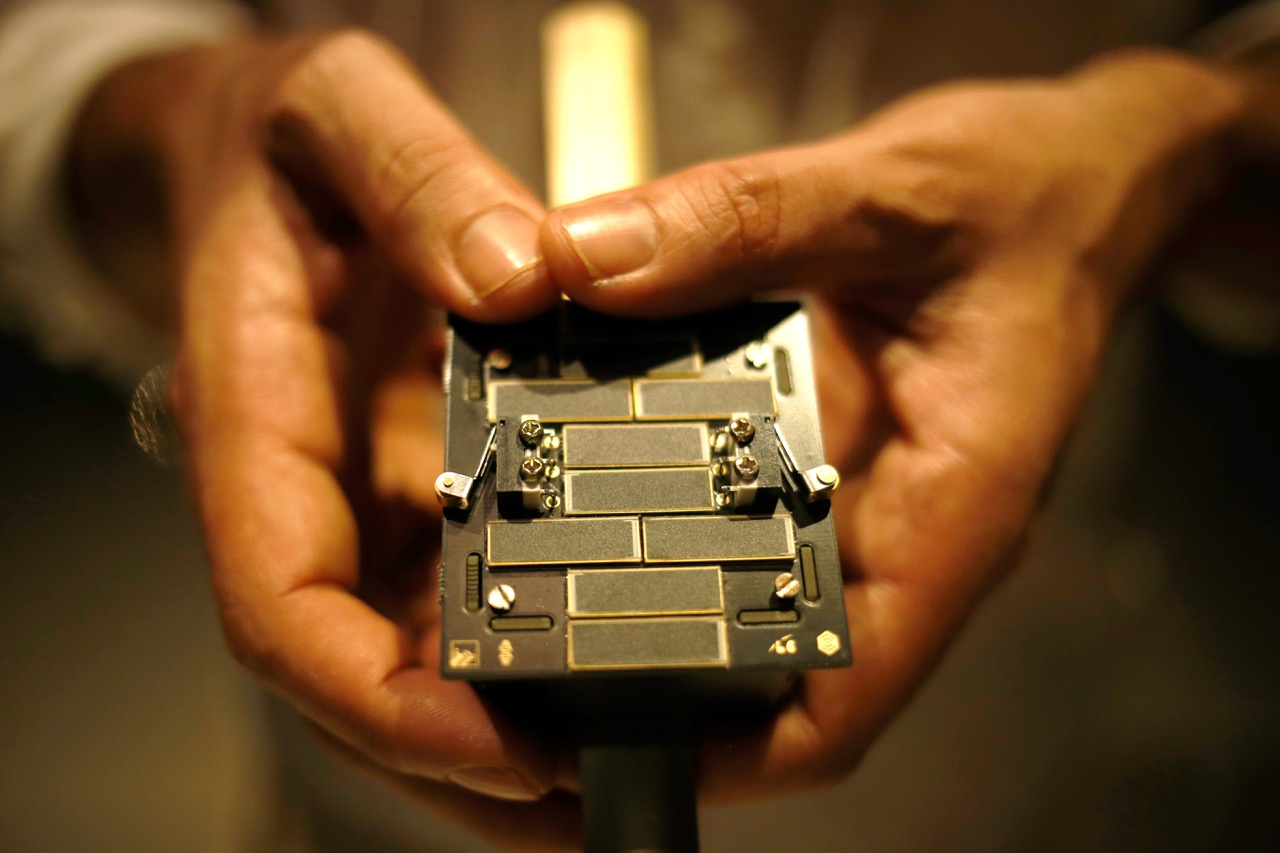
Brazilian artist Edson Pavoni holds the PocketQube satellite Orbital Temple, the first artistic satellite from the Global South.

Satellites can be classified by physical scale, spacecraft architecture, and how mission hardware is carried or coordinated. This includes mass classes from small satellites and CubeSats to larger spacecraft platforms, as well as modular buses, hosted payloads, and formation-flying designs.

- CubeSats
  - Aalto-1 – Finnish research nanosatellite
  - AAU CubeSat – CubeSat built and operated by Aalborg University, Denmark
    - AAUSat-2 – CubeSat built and operated by Aalborg University, Denmark
    - AAUSat-3 – CubeSat built and operated by Aalborg University, Denmark
  - ArduSat – Arduino-based CubeSat science project
  - BioSentinel – US experimental astrobiology research satellite
  - BRICSat-P – United States technology demonstration and amateur radio cubesat
  - CAPSTONE – NASA satellite to test the Lunar Gateway orbit
  - Cornell University Satellite – American technology demonstration satellite
  - Cubesat Space Protocol – Small network-layer delivery protocol for cubesats
  - Delfi-C3 – Dutch mini-satellite
  - Educational Launch of Nanosatellites – NASA educational satellite program
  - ESTCube-1 – Estonian nanosatellite
  - FUNcube-1 – Educational CubeSat satellite
  - GeneSat-1 – NASA cubesat
  - Interplanetary Nano-Spacecraft Pathfinder in Relevant Environment – Planned NASA mission
  - List of CubeSats
  - Mars Cube One – 2018 Mars flyby mission
  - PhoneSat – NASA satellite research project
  - Quakesat – Earth Observation nanosatellite
- Formation-flying satellites
  - A-train (satellite constellation) – Satellite constellation of three Earth observation satellites
  - Aqua (satellite) – NASA scientific research satellite (2002–present)
  - Aura (satellite) – NASA Earth observation satellite (2004–present)
  - CALIPSO – Environmental satellite
  - CloudSat – NASA Earth observation satellite
  - Cluster II (spacecraft) – European Space Agency space mission
  - DART (satellite) – NASA Autonomous Rendezvous demo 2005
  - Docking and berthing of spacecraft – Joining of two or more space vehicles
  - Formation flying – Flight of multiple objects in a coordinated shape or pattern
  - GRACE and GRACE-FO – Joint American-German space mission to map Earth's gravitational field
  - Magnetospheric Multiscale Mission – Four NASA robots studying Earth's magnetosphere (2015–present)
  - Orbital Express – US project to autonomously service satellites in orbit ~2007
  - PROBA-3 – European Space Agency mission
  - Satellite formation flying
  - Swarm (spacecraft) – ESA's space program to study Earth's magnetic field
  - TanDEM-X – German Earth observation satellite mission
  - TerraSAR-X – German Earth observation satellite
  - THEMIS – NASA satellite of the Explorer program
- Hosted payloads
  - Ariane Passenger Payload Experiment – Communication satellite
  - Atmospheric Waves Experiment
  - Geostationary Carbon Cycle Observatory
  - Hosted payload
  - Intelsat 40e – Geostationary communications satellite
  - Kibō (ISS module) – Japanese ISS module, used on ISS press conferences
  - Materials International Space Station Experiment – NASA science observatories on the orbital research platform
  - Optical Payload for Lasercomm Science – 2014 ISS instrument to test laser downlink
  - SES-2 – Geostationary Communications satellite
  - Space Test Program – US DoD space access program
  - Tropospheric Emissions: Monitoring of Pollution
- Large satellites
  - Advanced Extremely High Frequency – Series of American military communications satellites
  - Alphabus – Family of geostationary communications satellites
  - Boeing 702 – Satellite bus designed and manufactured by Boeing
  - Envisat – ESA Earth observation satellite (2002–2012)
  - GOES-16 – NOAA weather satellite
  - International Space Station – Modular space station in low Earth orbit
  - James Webb Space Telescope – NASA/ESA/CSA space telescope launched in 2021
  - Landsat 8 – American earth observation satellite
  - Lanteris 1300 – Satellite bus
  - Lockheed Martin A2100 – Satellite bus
  - Meteosat – Series of european weather satellites
  - Satellite bus – Main body and structural component of the satellite
  - Spacebus – Brand of satellite bus
  - Terra (satellite) – NASA climate research satellite (1999–present)
  - WorldView-3 – Commercial Earth observation satellite
- Microsatellites
  - Aspera (spacecraft) – NASA mission to study galaxy evolution
  - Blackjack (satellite) – Constellation of American surveillance satellites
  - EOS 02 – Indian Earth observation satellite
    - EOS-08 – 2024 Indian earth-observation satellite
  - Microsat (ISRO) – Indian Earth observation satellite
  - Microsat-R – India earth-observing satellite
  - MOST (spacecraft) – Canada's first space telescope
  - Microsatellite – Satellites of low mass and size, usually under 1200 kg
  - SNAP-1
  - TET-1
- Minisatellites
  - Canadian Advanced Nanospace eXperiment Program – Canadian CubeSat nanosatellite program
  - PROBA – European Space Agency satellite
    - PROBA-2 – European Space Agency satellite
    - PROBA-V – European Space Agency satellite
  - Small satellite – Satellites of low mass and size, usually under 1200 kg
  - Minisatellite – Satellites of low mass and size, usually under 1200 kg
  - TET-1
- Modular satellites
  - Alphabus – Family of geostationary communications satellites
  - Boeing 702 – Satellite bus designed and manufactured by Boeing
  - Comparison of satellite buses
  - Eurostar (satellite bus) – Telecommunications satellite platform
    - Eurostar E3000 – Series of satellite bus
  - GEOStar
  - Lanteris 1300 – Satellite bus
  - Lockheed Martin A2100 – Satellite bus
  - Modular Common Spacecraft Bus – General purpose spacecraft platform
  - Multi-mission Modular Spacecraft
  - Satellite bus – Main body and structural component of the satellite
  - Spacebus – Brand of satellite bus
    - Spacebus 4000 – Brand of satellite bus
- Nanosatellites
  - Aalto-1 – Finnish research nanosatellite
  - AAU CubeSat – CubeSat built and operated by Aalborg University, Denmark
    - AAUSat-2 – CubeSat built and operated by Aalborg University, Denmark
    - AAUSat-3 – CubeSat built and operated by Aalborg University, Denmark
  - AzaadiSAT – Indian earth observation satellite
  - BRICSat-P – United States technology demonstration and amateur radio cubesat
  - Canadian Advanced Nanospace eXperiment Program – Canadian CubeSat nanosatellite program
  - Delfi-C3 – Dutch mini-satellite
  - ESTCube-1 – Estonian nanosatellite
  - GeneSat-1 – NASA cubesat
  - Lume-1 – Spanish nanosatellite
  - PharmaSat
  - PhoneSat – NASA satellite research project
  - Nanosatellite – Satellites of low mass and size, usually under 1200 kg
  - SNAP-1
- Picosatellites
  - Breakthrough Starshot – Interstellar probe project
  - Femtosatellite – Satellites of low mass and size, usually under 1200 kg
  - Interorbital Systems – American aerospace company
  - KickSat – Citizen science project
  - PicoSAT – Microsatellite testing electronic components/systems in space conditions
  - PocketQube – Type of miniaturized satellite
  - Picosatellite – Satellites of low mass and size, usually under 1200 kg
  - SPRITE (spacecraft) – Proposed NASA Saturn atmospheric probe mission concept
- PocketQubes
  - Alba Orbital – Satellite manufacturing company
  - FOSSA Systems – Satellite manufacturing company
  - PocketQube – Type of miniaturized satellite
- Small satellites
  - Alba Orbital – Satellite manufacturing company
  - Astra Rocket – Launch vehicles developed by Astra
  - Blackjack (satellite) – Constellation of American surveillance satellites
  - Educational Launch of Nanosatellites – NASA educational satellite program
  - Electron (rocket) – Two-stage small launch vehicle, 200–300 kg to LEO
  - Firefly Alpha – Two-stage small satellite launch rocket
  - LauncherOne – Two-stage, air-launched rocket by Virgin Orbit
  - Nanosatellite Launch System
  - Pegasus (rocket) – Air-launched rocket
  - PocketQube – Type of miniaturized satellite
  - Rocket Lab – American public spaceflight company
  - Small satellite – Satellites of low mass and size, usually under 1200 kg
  - Small Satellite Launch Vehicle – Indian small-lift launch vehicle
  - Student Space Exploration & Technology Initiative

== See also ==
=== Related outlines ===
- Outline of aerospace – overview of aerospace topics.
- Outline of artificial intelligence – overview of artificial intelligence topics.
- Outline of astronomy – overview of astronomy topics.
- Outline of astrophysics – overview of astrophysics topics.
- Outline of computer science – overview of computer science topics.
- Outline of Earth science – overview of Earth science topics.
- Outline of electronics – overview of electronics topics.
- Outline of geophysics – overview of geophysics topics.
- Outline of meteorology – overview of weather and atmospheric science topics.
- Outline of military science and technology – overview of military science and technology topics.
- Outline of physics – overview of physics topics.
- Outline of space exploration – overview of space exploration topics.
- Outline of space science – overview of space science topics.
- Outline of the Moon – overview of Earth's natural satellite.
- Outline of the Solar System – overview of Solar System topics.

=== Related topics ===
- Aerospace engineering
- Orbital mechanics
- Remote sensing
- Space law
- Telecommunications
