= Skynet =

Skynet may refer to:

== Airlines ==
- Sky Net Airline, a charter airline from Armenia
- Skynet (airline), a Russian regional airline based at the Krasnoyarsk Airport
- Skynet Airlines, a defunct Irish airline that operated in 2001–2004
- Skynet, a domestic airmail network run by Royal Mail
- Solaseed Air, a low-cost Japanese airline previously known as Skynet Asia Airways

== Communications ==
- Copyright (Infringing File Sharing) Amendment Act 2011, which repeals a section of the New Zealand Copyright Act which would have required ISPs to disconnect subscribers suspected of repeat copyright infringement
- Proximus Skynet, originally Belgacom Skynet, a Belgian interactive digital media company which provided internet, email and portal service until 2019
- Sky Net, a direct-to-home (DTH) TV broadcasting company in Myanmar
- Sky Television (New Zealand), a pay television service also referred to as Sky Network Television
- Skynet (satellite), a UK military communications system
  - Skynet 5A
  - Skynet 5B
  - Skynet 5D
- Loral Skynet, American satellite operator, merged with Telesat Canada in 2007

== Surveillance ==
- SKYNET (surveillance program), a program by the U.S. National Security Agency
- Operation Sky Net, the Chinese government's video mass surveillance system

== Terminator franchise ==
- Skynet (Terminator), a fictional computer network, the primary antagonist in the Terminator franchise
- Skynet (video game), a 1996 PC game based on the Terminator film series

== Other ==
- Skynet, a 1998 album by Juan Atkins under the Infiniti alias
- Skynet University, a NASA-funded astronomy telescope research course-based program offered by the University of North Carolina
- theSkyNet, an astronomy research project
- Skynet, the artificial intelligence found in the game Fallout 2

== See also ==
- Sky Television (disambiguation), including TV networks named Sky
- Sky Network (disambiguation)
