= Skynet 5B =

British military communications satellite

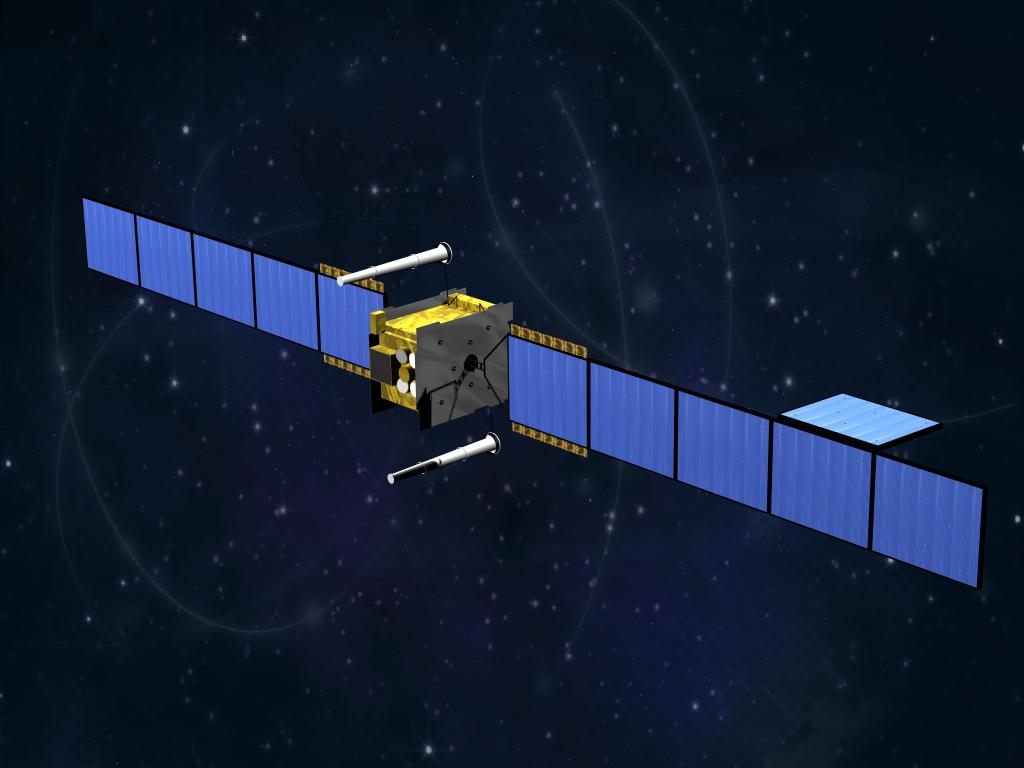
- Mission type: Military communications
- Operator: Paradigm Secure Communications; EADS Astrium; On behalf of British Ministry of Defence
- COSPAR ID: 2007-056B
- SATCAT no.: 32294
- Mission duration: 15 years

Spacecraft properties
- Bus: Eurostar 3000S
- Manufacturer: Astrium
- Launch mass: 4,635 kilograms (10,218 lb)

Start of mission
- Launch date: 14 November 2007, 22:06 UTC
- Rocket: Ariane 5ECA V179
- Launch site: Kourou ELA-3
- Contractor: Arianespace

Orbital parameters
- Reference system: Geocentric
- Regime: Geostationary
- Longitude: 25° East

Skynet 5B is a military communications satellite operated by Astrium Services, formerly Paradigm Secure Communications, on behalf of the British Ministry of Defence. It was the second of four Skynet 5 satellites to be launched.

== Spacecraft ==
The Skynet 5B spacecraft is a Eurostar 3000S satellite, constructed by Astrium. At launch it had a mass of approximately 4,635 kilograms (10,218 lb), with a design life of 15 years. Its 34-metre (112 ft) solar arrays will generate a minimum of 6 kilowatts to power its UHF and X-band communications systems.

The Skynet 5 constellation was originally intended to consist of two satellites, the other of which, Skynet 5A, was launched earlier in 2007. By the time of Skynet 5B's launch, a decision had been made to launch the backup spacecraft, Skynet 5C, as an on-orbit spare; this was launched in 2008. Skynet 5D was ordered to replace the backup, however this too was launched in 2012. Skynet 5 replaced the earlier Skynet 4 system.

== Launch ==
Skynet 5B was launched by an Ariane 5ECA carrier rocket flying from ELA-3 at Kourou. The launch occurred at 22:06 UTC on 14 November 2007. Star One C1 was launched aboard the same carrier rocket; Skynet 5B was mounted atop a Sylda 5 adaptor, with Star One C1 attached to the upper stage underneath the Sylda. Skynet 5B was the first of the two spacecraft to separate from the carrier rocket.

== Orbit ==
The launch placed Skynet 5B into a 250 by 35,786 kilometres (155 by 22,236 mi) geosynchronous transfer orbit with 6 degrees of inclination. The satellite used its apogee motor to raise itself into geostationary orbit. It is located at a longitude of 53° East, in an orbit with a perigee of 35,572 kilometres (22,103 mi), an apogee of 35,867 kilometres (22,287 mi), and 0 degrees inclination.
