= Sky Network =

Sky Network may refer to:

- Sky Television (New Zealand), a pay television service in New Zealand, which is also referred to as Sky Network Television
- Sky Group, a British broadcaster and telecommunications company

== See also ==
- Skynet (disambiguation)
