= Sky Television =

Sky Television may refer to:

- Sky Group, a pan-European broadcasting company (formerly British Sky Broadcasting (BSkyB))
  - Sky UK, a television and radio platform run by Sky Group
  - Sky Ireland, a satellite television service in Ireland run by Sky Group
  - Sky Deutschland, a satellite television service in Germany run by Sky Group
  - Sky Italia, an Italian digital satellite television service run by Sky Group
  - Sky Television (1984–1990), a four-channel network launched by Rupert Murdoch in 1984; merged with British Satellite Broadcasting to form BSkyB
- Sky (New Zealand), a pay TV network in New Zealand
- SKY Perfect JSAT Group
  - SKY PerfecTV!, in Japan
- Sky México, in Mexico
- SKY Brasil, in Brazil
- Sky Turk 360, a Turkish television service
- Sky (cable company), a Philippines television provider

== See also ==
- Skai TV, a Greek television network
- Skynet (disambiguation), including some networks named Sky
- Sky (disambiguation)
