= Reacher Satellite Ground Terminal =

British military telecommunications device

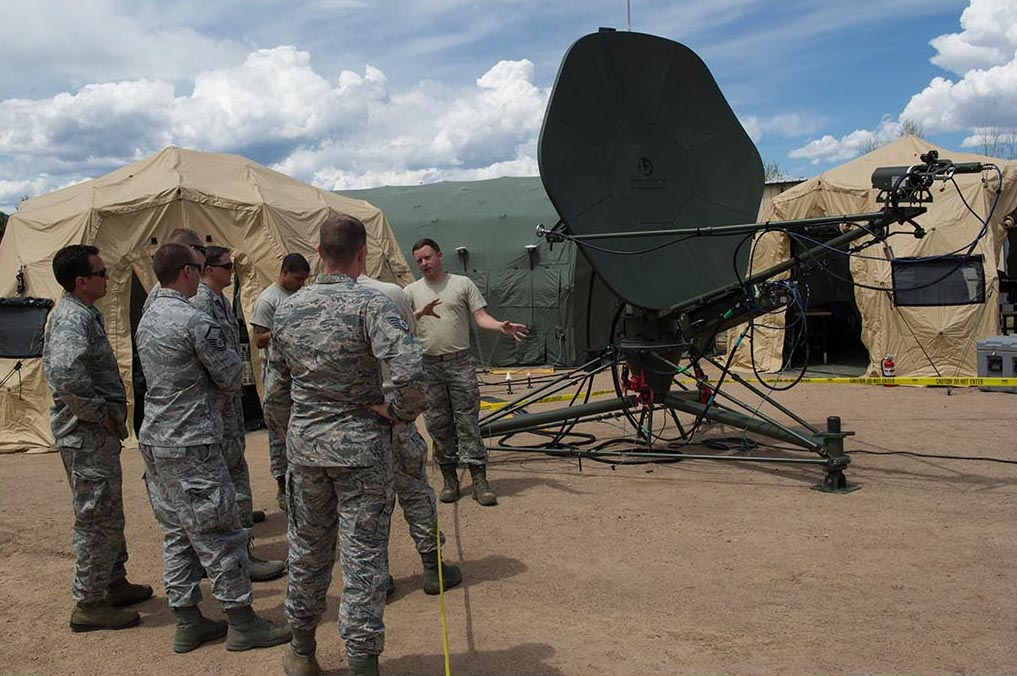
L-3 Communications satellite terminal (similar to Reacher) being briefed at Schriever AFB

Reacher is a mobile X‐Band Satellite ground terminal (SGT) acquired by the British Ministry Of Defence, it is designed to replace all medium and large legacy SGTs used in the land environment. It is intended to deliver services through Skynet 5 satellites, and to assist in the transition to TCP/IP network protocol services. Reacher was brought into service in 2007.

Secure communications are delivered through the Skynet 5 Service Delivery Wrap contract with Team Aurora in partnership with Information Systems and Services at MOD Corsham.

== Variants ==
Reacher came initially in three variants, 44 of which were delivered to the military:

- Reacher Large, mounted on a Mowag Duro III vehicle, provides an assured data rate of 8 Mbit/s through a 4.5 metres (15 ft) antenna. Reacher Large takes15 minutes to set up and can only be used when stationary.
- Reacher Medium is mounted on a Mowag Duro III 6 x 6 vehicle and provides an assured data rate of 2 Mbit/s through a 2.4 metres (7 ft 10 in) antenna. It is ready for immediate use.
- Reacher Royal Marine (RM). Reacher RM is mounted on two amphibious Bandvagn 206 vehicles and provides an assured data rate of 2 Mbit/s through a 2.4 m antenna. It is designed for use in amphibious warfare. It has been used in Operations Telic and Herrick on land in the same role as Reacher Medium.

As of 2014, two new variants were under development:

- High Capacity Reacher, a variant of Reacher Medium to deliver throughput up to 32 Mbit/s
- Reacher Hub, a variant of Reacher Large to deliver throughput up to 64 Mbit/s and the ability to interoperate with commercial satellite terminals

== Transport ==
All Reacher terminals are transportable using Chinook helicopters (underslung). The Large variant can be transported by C-17 Globemaster III and the Medium and RM variants by C-130 Hercules.
