= Skynet 5C =

British military communications satellite

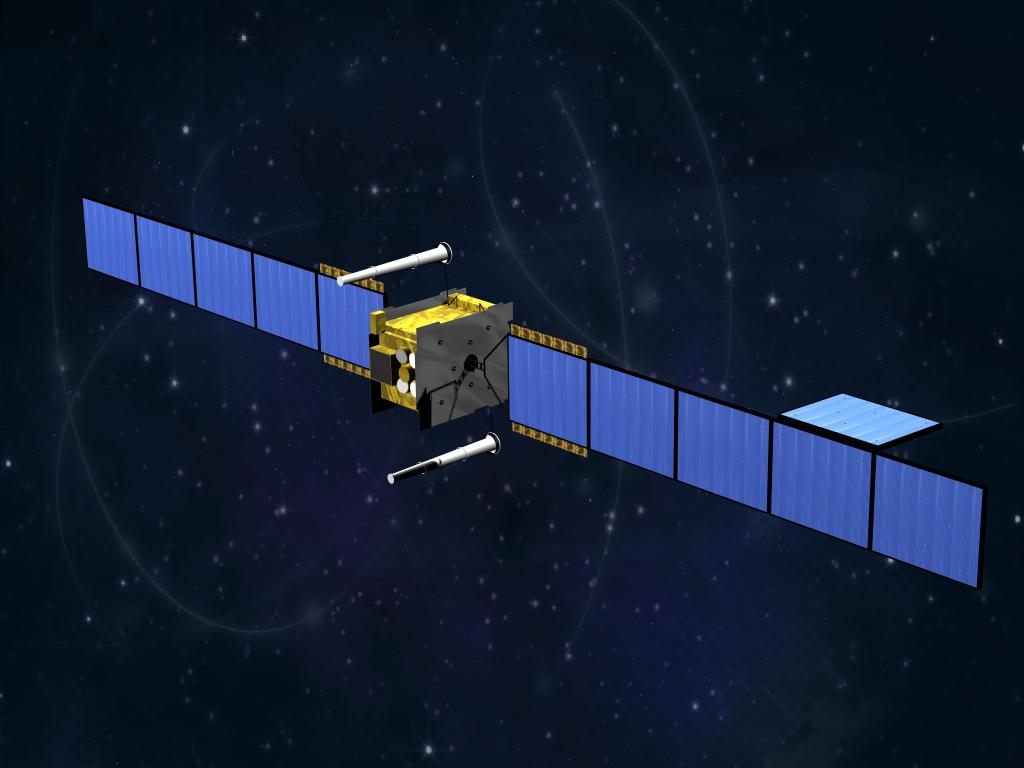
- Mission type: Military communications
- Operator: Paradigm Secure Communications; EADS Astrium; On behalf of British Ministry of Defence
- COSPAR ID: 2008-030A
- SATCAT no.: 33055
- Mission duration: 15 years

Spacecraft properties
- Manufacturer: EADS Astrium
- Launch mass: 4,700 kilograms (10,400 lb)

Start of mission
- Launch date: 12 June 2008
- Rocket: Ariane 5ECA
- Launch site: Kourou ELA-3
- Contractor: Arianespace

Orbital parameters
- Reference system: Geocentric
- Regime: Geosynchronous

Skynet 5C is the third of four Skynet 5 military communications satellites to be used by the British Ministry of Defence (MOD).

== Launch ==
It was launched from French Guiana aboard an Ariane 5ECA carrier rocket at 22:05:02 GMT on 12 June 2008. The launch was originally scheduled for 23 May, but was delayed to 30 May, and then delayed again due to software problems with the carrier rocket. Originally built as a ground spare satellite, the decision to launch was made in 2007. Arianespace provided launch services.

== Spacecraft ==
It was constructed by EADS Astrium under a contract to its subsidiary company Paradigm Secure Communications, who will operate the satellite on behalf of the MoD. Based on the Eurostar E3000 satellite bus, it has a mass of 4,700 kilograms, and an expected on-orbit lifetime of 15 years.

Skynet 5C is part of a constellation of communications satellites for the United Kingdom Ministry of Defense that supports nuclear hardened and protected military X-band and UHF frequency capabilities.

Skynet 5C is located at 17.8 degrees West.
