= Skynet (satellite) =

Communications satellite

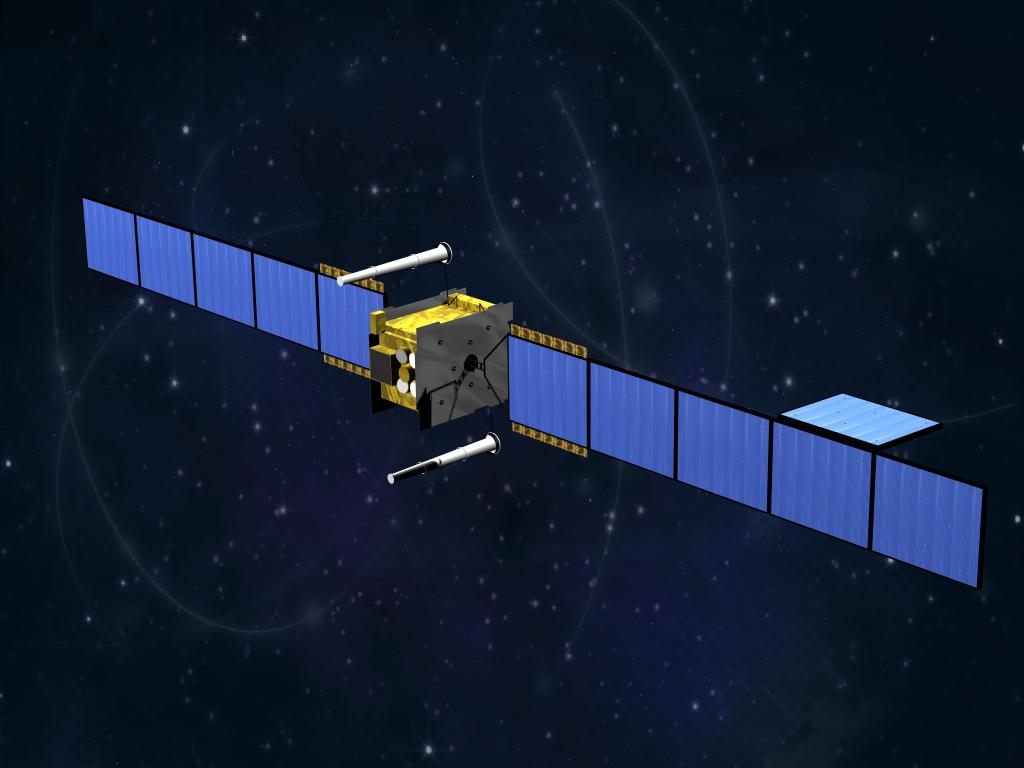
An artist's impression of a Skynet 5 satellite

Skynet is a family of military communications satellites, now operated by Babcock International on behalf of the United Kingdom's Ministry of Defence (MOD). They provide strategic and tactical communication services to the branches of the British Armed Forces, the British intelligence agencies, some UK government departments and agencies, and to allied governments. Since 2015 when Skynet coverage was extended eastward, and in conjunction with an Anik G1 satellite module over America, Skynet offers near global coverage.

The Skynet contract allows the sale of surplus bandwidth, through the Skynet partner programme, to NATO and allied governments, including the Five Eyes intelligence alliance members (Australia, Canada, New Zealand, the United Kingdom and the United States). As of 2020, seven Skynet satellites are operating, plus Anik G1.

The Skynet 1 to 4 series were developed and operated by the Signals Research and Development Establishment, Royal Signals and Radar Establishment and Royal Air Force until 2003. It was subsequently operated with Skynet 5 by Paradigm Secure Communications until October 2012, when the organisation was rebranded to Astrium Services then through merger in 2015 became Airbus Defence and Space. Primary control of Skynet returned to the Ministry of Defence in 2022.

The MOD is currently specifying a new architecture for Skynet to replace the Skynet 5 system. The vision for Skynet 6 is a flexible system architecture that combines UK government, allied and commercial satellites, including the current Skynet 5 satellites. Skynet is the large part of the MOD Future Beyond Line of Sight satellite communications programme (FBLOS), which extends to 2041, with expected transition costs of about £6 billion. Skynet 6A is being procured as a transition to the new architecture, but as of 2026 the exact form of the new architecture is still under discussion.

== History ==
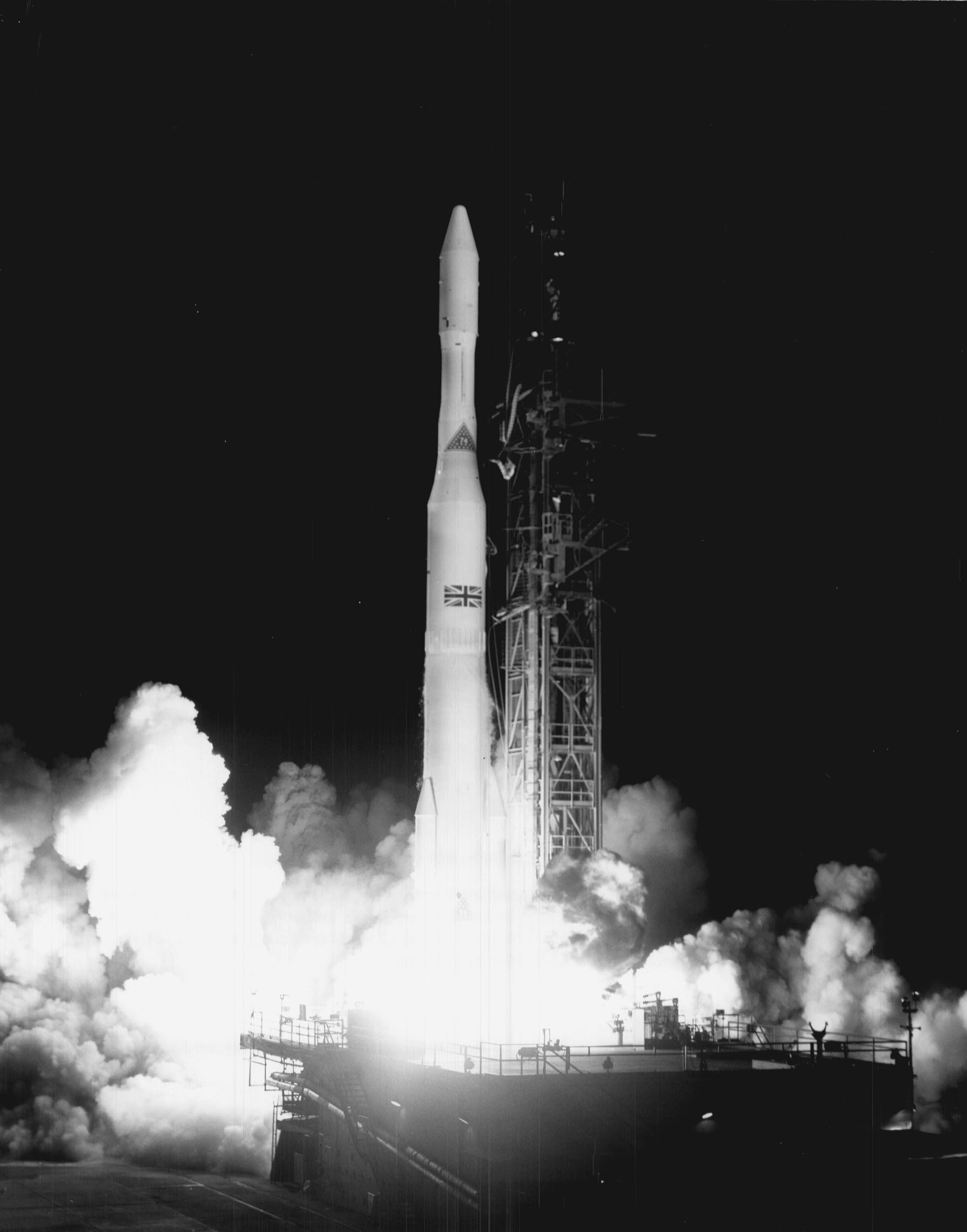
Launch of the first Skynet satellite, Skynet 1A, by Delta rocket in 1969 from Cape Canaveral

In the 1960s, only two countries had communication satellites, the United States and the Soviet Union. The United Kingdom created Skynet as its own military communications satellite system, because of inadequate undersea communications cable availability and to increase flexibility, reliability, data capacity and security. The Signals Research and Development Establishment led the development of Skynet 1 and 2, and its successor Royal Signals and Radar Establishment carried out research for the development of the subsequent satellites and ground terminals.

The MOD space communications research programme began in 1962, initially considering Moon and space debris bounce techniques, before considering a UK satellite. In 1964, it was decided Skynet should be in geostationary orbit over the Indian Ocean, significantly to support East of Suez deployments, and have a transponder with two channels permitting communications between two types of ground station. This would be an advance over the ongoing U.S. Initial Defense Communication Satellite Program (IDCSP). In 1965, the U.S. invited the MOD to participate in their IDCSP programme, and to participate Marconi were contracted to build three 40 foot diameter air transportable ground stations for the launch of the first IDCSP satellites in 1966. As Britain had insufficient industry expertise to build satellites, a contact was placed with U.S. Philco Ford to build Skynet 1, but with the assistance of Marconi to improve UK expertise for Skynet 2.

Nine ground stations were initially planned, which could also communicate with sub-geostationary U.S. IDCSP satellites:

- three principal stations at RAF Oakhanger, Cyprus and Singapore with 40 foot dishes and 20 kW transmitters
- two stations at HMS Jufair and RAF Gan (Indian Ocean) with air transportable 20 foot dishes and 5 kW transmitters called SKYNET V
- two additional air-transportable stations
- two Royal Navy ship stations with 6 foot dishes and 5 kW transmitters, initially installed on HMS Fearless (L10) and HMS Intrepid (L11) but movable to HMS Hermes (R12) and HMS Ark Royal (R09) as required

Skynet 1A was the first military satellite in geostationary orbit, in 1969. The Royal Air Force displayed a model of the Skynet satellite on the children's television show Blue Peter in 1969, the show also described the new British satellite control centre at RAF Oakhanger.

The Skynet satellites provided secure and encrypted facilities, though expensively, for the British armed forces and intelligence agencies. It enables an important sovereign command and control service. The largest user of the Skynet satellites during the Cold War was the Government Communications Headquarters (GCHQ), who were responsible for over 80% of traffic at some locations such as Cyprus. Despite the enormous communications capability of Skynet, GCHQ still found the capacity provided by Skynet to be inadequate. In 1972, GCHQ was still the satellite's largest funder, and argued for the purchase of an American built Type-777 (DSCS II) satellite instead. GCHQ would later plan their own secret signals intelligence satellite, Zircon, which was subsequently cancelled. The circumstances around the reporting of Zircon's existence would become known as the Zircon affair.

Throughout its models, Skynet has interoperated with U.S. and NATO military communications satellites and ground stations.

In 2010, the Civil Contingencies Secretariat of the Cabinet Office launched the High Integrity Telecommunications System, a satellite-based emergency communications service based on Skynet, for use by UK police and other emergency services, primarily for use at Strategic Command Centres and at major events and emergencies. It replaced the earlier Emergency Communications Network.

In 2021 UK Space Command was created, which when fully operational will take over responsibility for Skynet from Strategic Command (previously known as Joint Forces Command), likely in 2023. In October 2025, commander of UK Space Command Major General Paul Tedman said that Russia was attempting to jam Skynet satellites on a weekly basis, and was collecting information about them. He added that as part of the joint Operation Olympic Defender, a US satellite, likely from the Geosynchronous Space Situational Awareness Program, was moved in September 2025 to inspect and confirm Skynet 5A was operating correctly.

The 2026 Defence Investment Plan (DIP) recognised that "space is the central nervous system of modern, high-intensity warfare, rather than just a supporting domain", reflecting the rapid technological changes seen in the Russo-Ukrainian war. The military space budget from 2030 to 2035 was increased, including for global satellite communication. £50 million was immediately allocated to extend the life of Skynet 5 satellites, partly responding to delays and changes in the Skynet 6 programme. On-orbit satellite servicing will be considered as an option for Skynet 5 satellites.

== Models ==
=== Skynet 1 ===
There were two Skynet 1 satellites (1A and 1B); Skynet 1A was launched on a Delta M on 22 November 1969, and stationed over the east coast of Africa. However, the satellite ceased operating after about 18 months when all of its Traveling Wave Tube Amplifiers (TWTAs) failed, probably when soldered high voltage joints failed after cycling between extreme temperatures. Some time in the mid-1970s, the now-defunct satellite was moved far from its original position; its current location in a stable "gravity well" (see Geostationary orbit#Stability) at longitude 105° W off the Pacific coast of Latin America is 36,000 km away from its original position, and it could not have simply drifted and ended up in this stable orbit. The new location is near satellite traffic and it has to be monitored for collision risks. In 2024, the BBC reported that there is no record of who moved it or why. Skynet 1B was launched on a Delta M on 19 August 1970. Skynet 1B was placed in a geostationary transfer orbit (GTO) and was abandoned in transfer orbit (270 x 36058 km) due to a failure of the Thiokol Star 17A apogee kick motor.

Skynet 1 series satellites had an orbit mass of 122 kg (269 lb), were spin-stabilised with a single despun antenna with 3 watts of output on two channels (2 MHz and 20 MHz). The North Atlantic Treaty Organization, NATO 2A and NATO 2B satellites, launched 1970 and 1971, were identical except for an antenna shaped to only cover NATO countries.

=== Skynet 2 ===
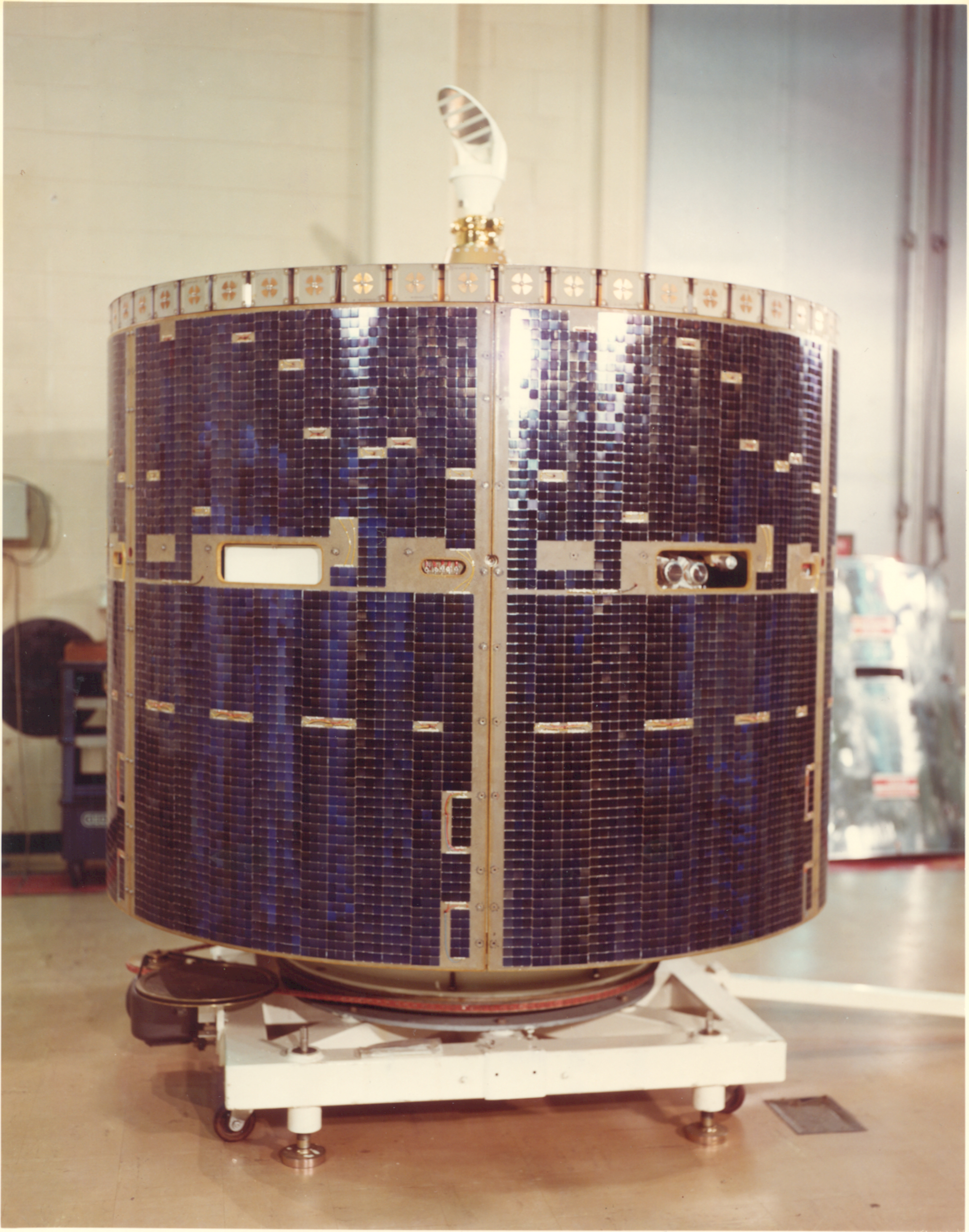
Skynet 2B being unpacked at Cape Canaveral for launch processing. It was successfully launched 23 November 1974.

Following the operational failure of the Skynet 1A satellite, the timetable for the launch of the Skynet 2 communications satellite was delayed. Skynet 2A was launched on the Delta 2313 by NASA for the United Kingdom on 19 January 1974. A short circuit in an electronics package circuit board (on second stage) left the upper stages and satellite in an unstable low orbit (96 x 3406 km x 37.6°) that rapidly decayed. An investigation revealed that a substandard coating had been used on the circuit board.

Despite being in an unstable orbit, the ground stations successfully located and tracked Skynet 2A and were able to use telemetry readings from the solar panels to determine its alignment. Based on this analysis, it was decided to use the alignment thrusters to deorbit the unit, and it was destroyed when it re-entered the Earth's atmosphere on 24 January 1974.

Skynet 2B was successfully launched on the Delta 2313 by NASA for the United Kingdom on 23 November 1974. It was positioned in geostationary orbit above Kenya to give coverage of Europe, Africa and a substantial part of Asia as far east at the Philippines. It could support about ten simultaneous users. Major ground stations used a 40-foot diameter dish, while in the field or at sea a 2 m diameter dish was used.

Skynet 2 satellites had an orbit mass of 250 kg (550 lb), with a single antenna with 16 watts of output.

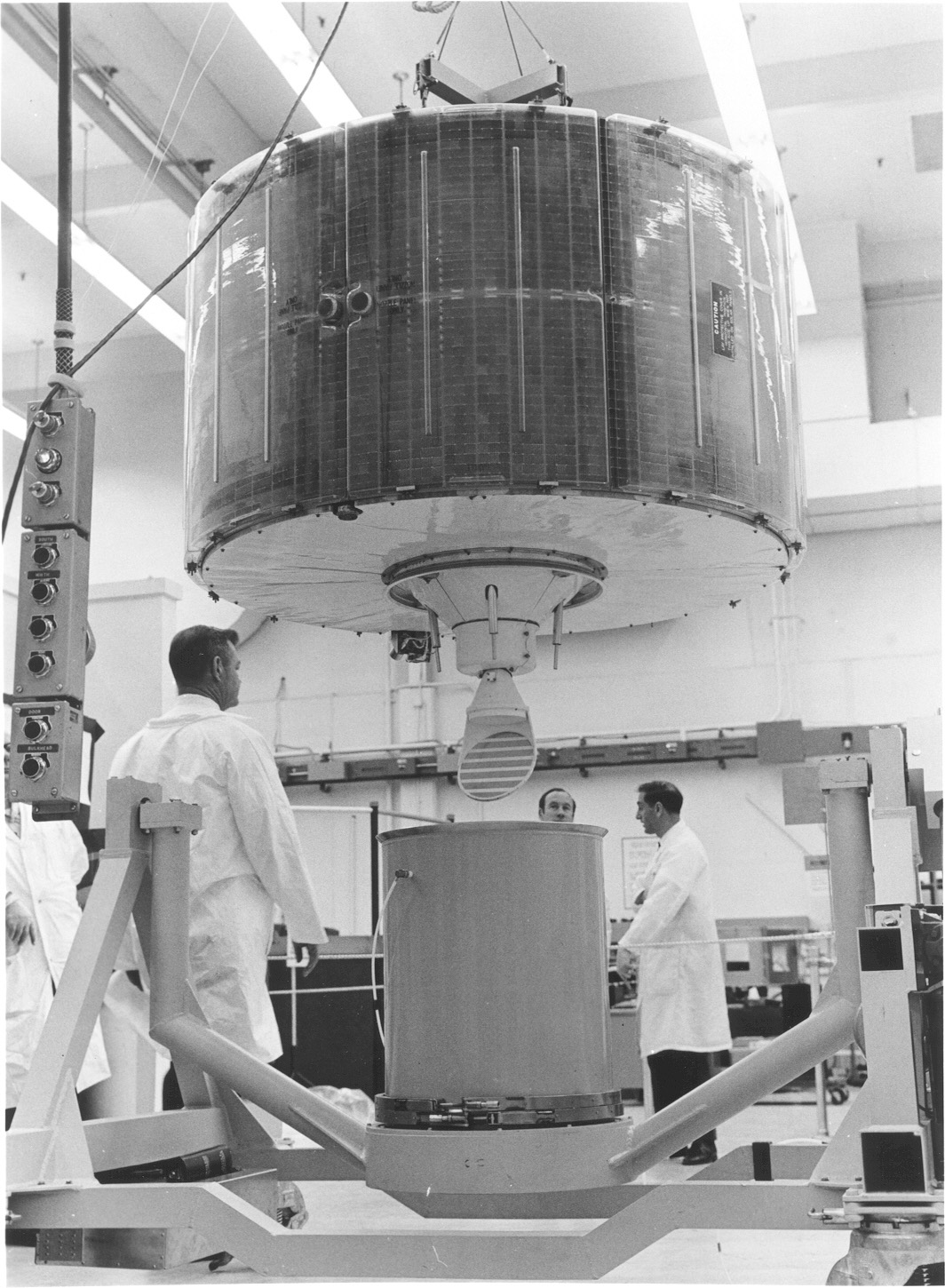
A Skynet 2 satellite being packed for shipment

The Skynet 2 series satellites were assembled and tested at the Marconi Space and Defence Systems establishment in Portsmouth, England, and were the first non-amateur communication satellites built outside the United States and USSR. The Signals Research and Development Establishment (SRE) led the development, and performed initial in-orbit testing. Subsequently, the Royal Signals and Radar Establishment supported Skynet satellites, including developing ground terminals and modems, at RAF Defford which was also a backup for the primary ground station at RAF Oakhanger. The Skynet 2B system was very successful for its time, and remained in service for 20 years although only having 2 communications channels.

=== Skynet 3 ===
Skynet 3 series satellites was cancelled as the United Kingdom withdrew East of Suez, and instead the capability it was intended to offer was delivered via U.S. and NATO assets. This dependence on U.S. assets was identified as a weakness during the Falklands War and was one of the contributing factors for the emergence of the Skynet 4 series satellites tranche of space vehicles. Technology improvements created the possibility of tactical satellite communications using smaller terminals, creating a new requirement beyond Skynet 3 strategic headquarters communications. The Royal Navy was also concerned that the high frequency radio alternative enabled location tracking by the Soviet Union Ocean Surveillance System.

=== Skynet 4 ===
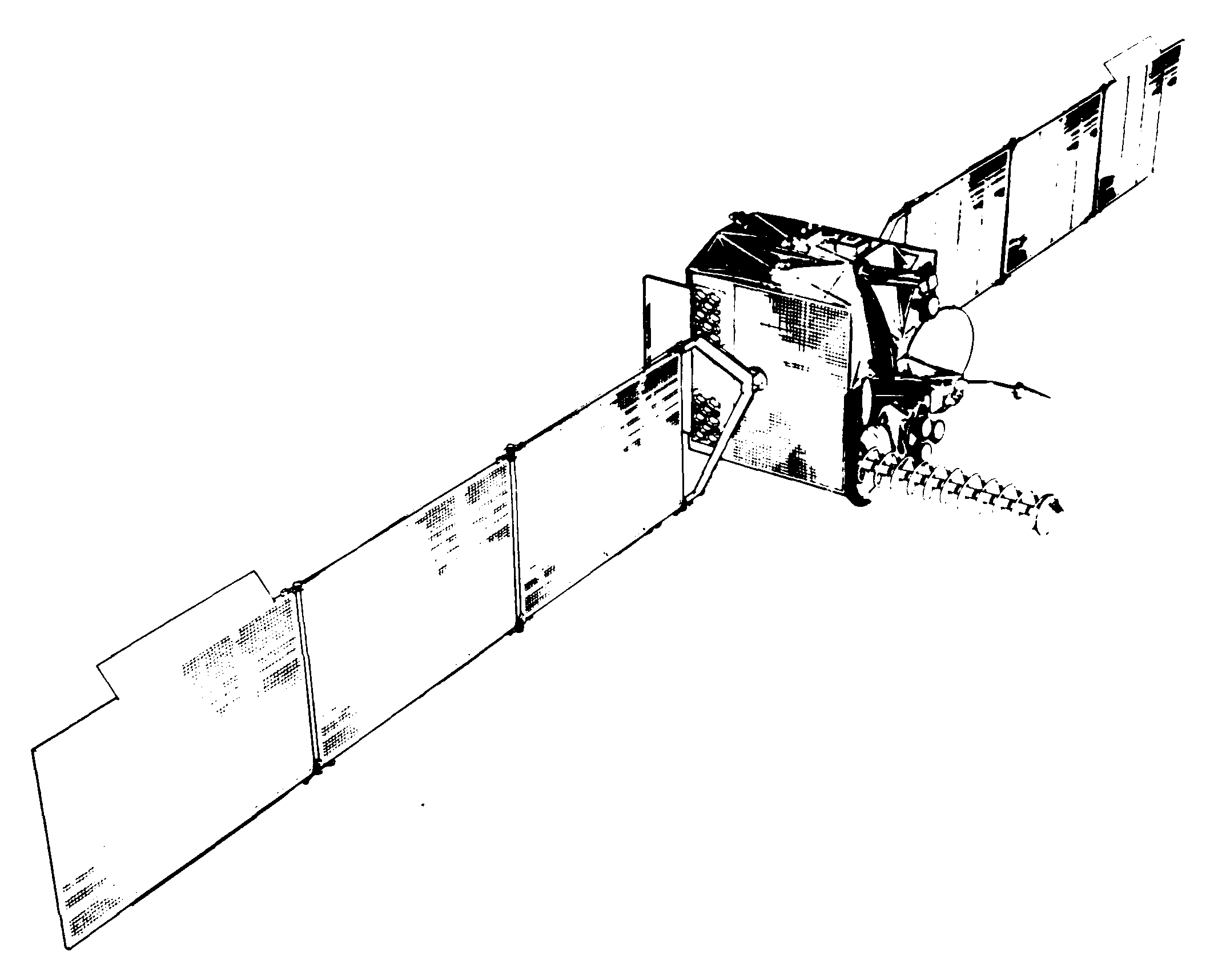
Drawing of Skynet 4 in orbit

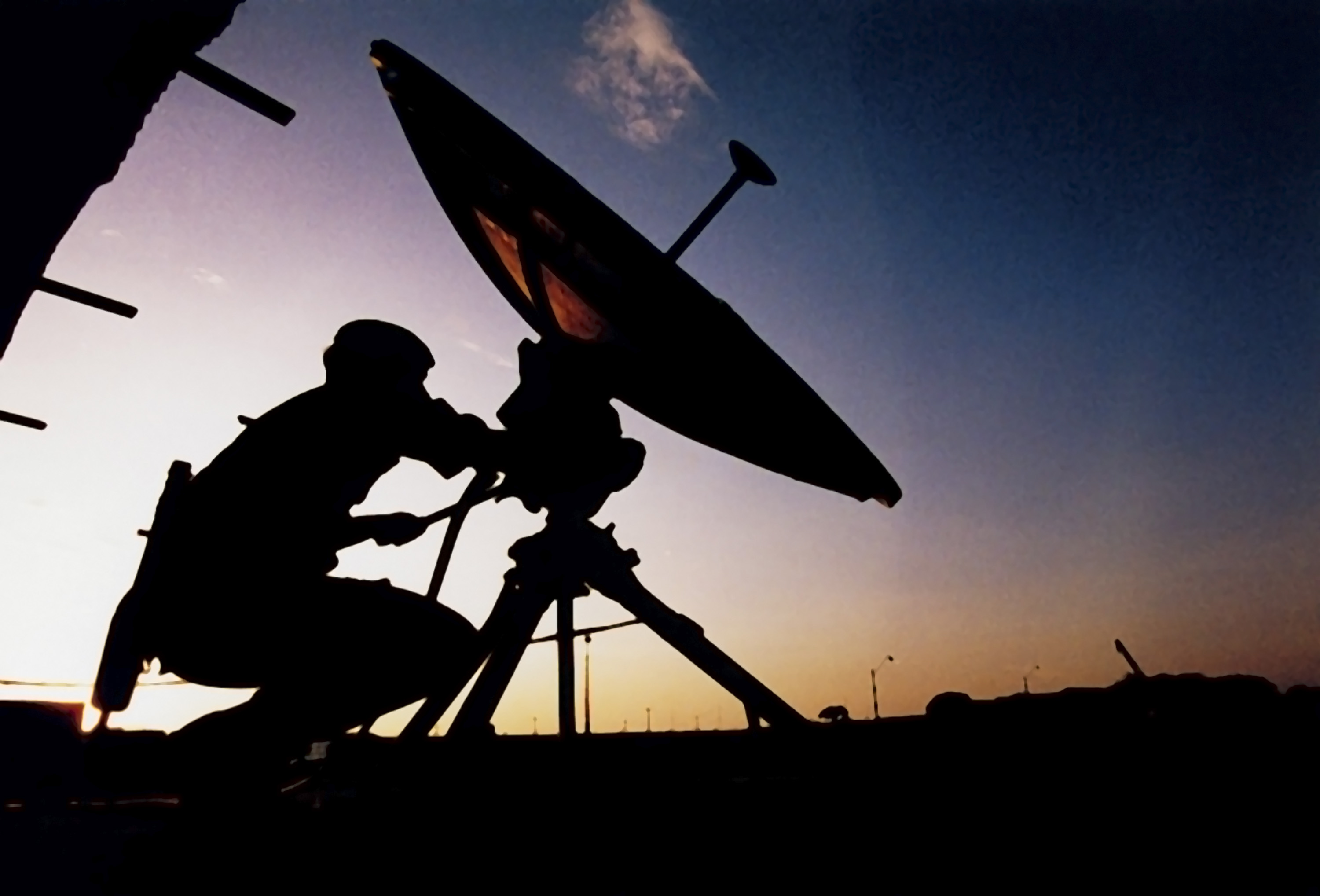
Soldier adjusting a small SATCOM ground terminal to Skynet in 2000

Skynet 4 series satellites have few similarities to the earlier generations, being based on the British Aerospace European Communications Satellite. The cylindrical body of Skynet 1 and 2 was replaced by a large square body housing antennas with deployable solar-cell arrays. This marks the technological improvement from spin-stabilisation, used in earlier cylindrical satellites, to three-axis stabilisation using momentum wheels and reaction wheels controlling the satellite gyroscopically. Each satellite had a design operational life of 7 years.

Skynet 4 manufacture was carried out by British Aerospace Dynamics (BAe Dynamics) with Matra Marconi Space (MMS) providing the Communications payload. NATO adapted the design for the NATO IVA and IVB communication satellites, also manufactured by BAe Dynamics. The programme timescales were delayed, as initially Skynet 4 was designed to be launched from the Space Shuttle (STS), with chosen RAF officers to be part of each Shuttle Crew. However, following the 1986 Challenger disaster (STS 51-L), the programme slowed and all the Skynet 4 series satellites had to be modified to suit the changes needed to go on a disposable launch vehicle. As Skynet 4A build was advanced it needed significant modification, and its completion was overtaken by Skynet 4B which had not progressed as far, and hence more easily converted. Consequently, Skynet 4B was finished first and launched in 1988, with Skynet 4A next in early 1990, and Skynet 4C later the same year. As of 2022, Skynet 4C is still in operation, providing service to the U.S. Amundsen–Scott South Pole Station for up to six hours a day because its orbital inclination has increased to 10.3°.

The Stage 1 satellites (4A, 4B and 4C) have multi-frequency capability and considerable operational flexibility, with selectable channels, gain and four antenna types of differing widths to support varying requirements, Ultra high frequency (UHF), Super high frequency (SHF) and experimental Extremely high frequency (EHF) channels are available. They are hardening against electromagnetic pulse (EMP) and have anti-jamming capability, with an un-degraded 1600 watts power supply. The satellites have a dry mass of 670 kg (1,480 lb), with three reaction wheels and hydrazine thrusters for station keeping.

The improved Stage 2 satellites (4D, 4E and 4F) were built by Matra Marconi Space and Astrium to replace the earlier versions. Improvements included increased power and resistance to electronic jamming. Skynet 4D was launched in 1998, Skynet 4E in 1999 and Skynet 4F in 2001. Skynet 4D was parked in a non-operational supersynchronous orbit on 28 January 2008.

Skynet 4 provides Ultra high frequency and Super high frequency services using Earth cover, wide area and spot beam coverage.

=== Skynet 5 ===
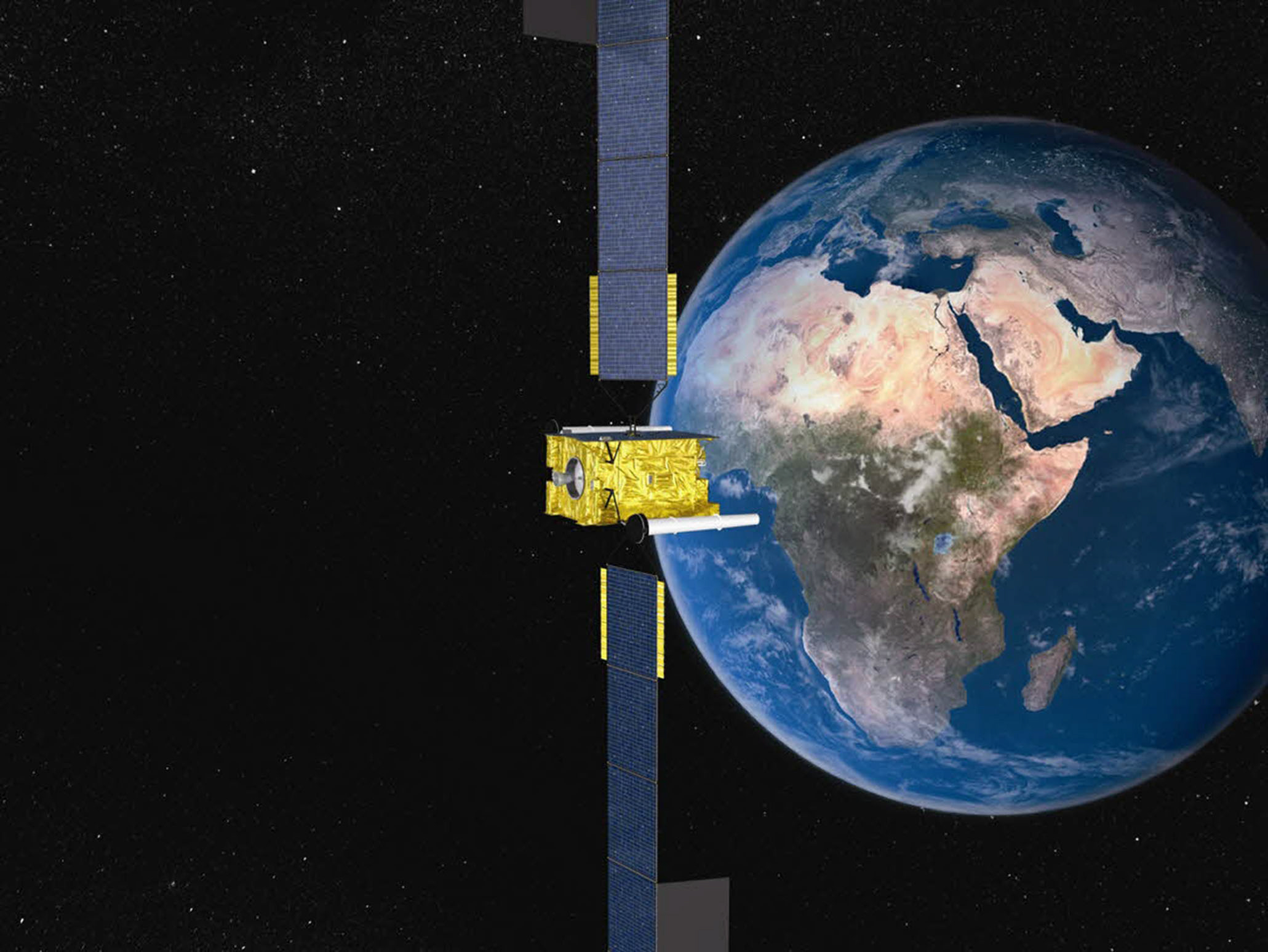
A CGI impression of Skynet 5D in orbit

Skynet 5 is the next generation of satellites, replacing the existing Skynet 4 Stage 2 satellites. It was contracted via Private Finance Initiative (PFI) to a partnership between Paradigm Secure Communications and EADS Astrium, a European spacecraft manufacturer. EADS Astrium was responsible for the build and delivery of Skynet 5 series satellites in orbit, whilst subsidiary company Paradigm was responsible for the provision of service to the Ministry of Defence (MOD). In 2010, the PFI contract was extended by two years to 2022, to a total cost of £3.66 billion over the course of the contract, with Paradigm able to sell bandwidth in excess of the capacity of 1.1 Skynet satellites to other allied countries. Paradigm had 220 staff and about 100 sub-contractors working on Skynet. Serco was a major subcontractor on the PFI programme. This was the biggest ever outsourced military satellite communications contract.

The Skynet 5 satellite is based on the Eurostar E3000 satellite bus design, weighs about 4,700 kg (10,400 lb), has two solar panels each about fifteen metres long, and has a power budget of five kilowatts. It has four steerable transmission dishes, and a phased-array receiver designed to allow jamming signals to be cancelled out. They will also resist attempts to disrupt them with high-powered lasers. Skynet 5 introduced full Internet Protocol (IP) support, increasing capability and usability.

Astrium described in 2010 the Skynet 5 system as:

The Skynet 5 satellites have the highest powered X-band transponders in orbit, a highly flexible uplink beam configuration, coupled with a world leading anti-jamming antenna to ensure that the constellation is extremely effective against hostile or non-hostile interference. All of the downlink beams are fully steerable and the whole payload is optimized to maximise performance for small, rapidly deployable satellite ground terminals on land, sea or air.

Skynet 5A was launched by an Ariane 5 launch vehicle at 22:03 UTC on 11 March 2007, in a launch shared with the Indian INSAT 4B civil communications satellite, and entered full service on 10 May 2007. The launch was delayed from 10 March 2007 due to malfunction of a launch pad deluge system. Skynet 5A successfully separated from its launch vehicle and telemetry was acquired by its dedicated Control Centre approximately 40 minutes after launch.

Skynet 5B was launched at 22:06 UTC on 14 November 2007, from Centre Spatial Guyanais, Kourou, in French Guiana, aboard an Ariane 5ECA launch vehicle. This launch was delayed from 9 November 2007 due to problems with the electronics on one of the Solid Rocket Boosters (SRB), and 12 November 2007 due to a fuelling problem with the launch pad. At time of launch, the Ariane 5ECA launcher set a new record on this mission, deploying a total payload of more than 8,700 kg (19,200 lb).

Skynet 5C was launched at 22:05:09 UTC on 12 June 2008, from Centre Spatial Guyanais, Kourou, in French Guiana, aboard an Ariane 5ECA launch vehicle. The launch had been delayed twice. Originally scheduled for 23 May 2008, more checks were carried out on the launch vehicle and the launch was rescheduled for 30 May 2008. A problem with the launch software during pre-launch checks led Arianespace to reschedule the launch for a second time to 12 June 2008. Skynet 5C was positioned to provide coverage from Iraq to the U.S. east coast, which would augment Paradigm's contract to provide 155 Mbps links to the U.S. military.

Skynet 5D was launched at 21:49:07 UTC on 19 December 2012, from Centre Spatial Guyanais, Kourou, in French Guiana, aboard an Ariane 5ECA launch vehicle. Skynet 5D provides more than double the UHF channels of the previous satellites, which are in demand as they support "comms on the move" for soldiers with backpack radios. The Ministry of Defence described the satellite as having a "key role in gathering intelligence on operations", as well as communications. Skynet 5D has larger fuel tanks enabling it to be repositioned more frequently if necessary.

The programme marks a change of approach in the UK from traditional defence procurement methods to a services-based contract which also includes provision of leased ground terminals, Reacher vehicles, the Satellite Communications Onboard Terminal (SCOT) for ships, and the associated baseband equipment.

Initially two Skynet 5 satellites were to be built, with insurance covering any launch loss; the MOD later decided to have a third satellite built in advance, and later still to have the third satellite launched to serve as an on-orbit spare, as well as an option to a fourth satellite, as a cheaper alternative to insurance.

In 2011, The MOD took ownership of a NATO satellite with two UHF channels, to support the additional demands from British involvement in the War in Afghanistan. Control of this satellite was incorporated into the Skynet 5 PFI contract.

The satellites are managed from a site named Hawthorn, a few hundred metres north of MOD Corsham, in partnership with MOD's Defence Digital (previously Information Systems & Services) who are based at MOD Corsham.

==== Expansion to near global coverage ====
In 2010, Paradigm announced it would lease the X-band (SHF) module on the Anik G1 commercial satellite at 107.3° West over the Pacific Ocean, covering the Americas and as far west as Hawaii, to complement Skynet system coverage. The three-channel, wide-beam X-band payload has performance similar to a Skynet 5 satellite, but without the military hardening. Anik G1 launched on 16 April 2013, improving the constellation's X-band capacity to 2.2 GHz of throughput.

In 2015, Skynet 5A was moved from 6° East, where it reinforced Middle East coverage, to 95° East, near West Sumatra. This move was to extend the Skynet coverage eastward in the Indian Ocean and to the western Pacific Ocean. With this move and Anik G1, Skynet offers near global coverage, from 178° West to 163° East.

In 2016, a new Australian ground station was opened at Mawson Lakes, Adelaide, managed by Airbus in partnership with SpeedCast, an Australian provider for over 25 years which works with the Australian military at that base. This complements Airbus's existing chain of ground stations in France, Germany, Norway, United Kingdom and the United States. The British High Commissioner Menna Rawlings said at the opening ceremony "Territorial disputes over uninhabited rocks and reefs have the potential to generate enough friction in international affairs to spark a confrontation", alluding to the territorial disputes in the South China Sea.

Airbus Defence and Space signed a further three partners, Hughes Network Systems, Inmarsat and SpeedCast, into its Skynet partner programme who offer third-party Skynet services. The Skynet contract also allow Airbus to sell surplus bandwidth to NATO and allied governments, including the Five Eyes intelligence alliance (Australia, Canada, New Zealand, the United Kingdom and the United States).

==== Technical specifications ====
The fleet of military X-band satellites have been specifically designed to support smaller, low powered, tactical terminals. Each Skynet 5 satellite is equipped with:

- High power 160W TWTAs on all transponders, giving 56 dBW peak EIRP in each transmit spot beam and 41 dBW peak EIRP in each global beam per transponder
- 15 active SHF / EHF transponders ranging in bandwidth from 20 GHz to 40 GHz
- Up to 9 UHF channels
- Multiple fully steerable downlink spot beams
- On Board Active Receive Antenna (OBARA) capable of generating multiple shaped uplink beams
- Flexible switching capability allowing connectivity between any uplink beam and at least two downlink beams
- Nuclear hardening, anti-jamming countermeasures and laser protection

=== Skynet 6 ===
==== Skynet 6A transition satellite ====
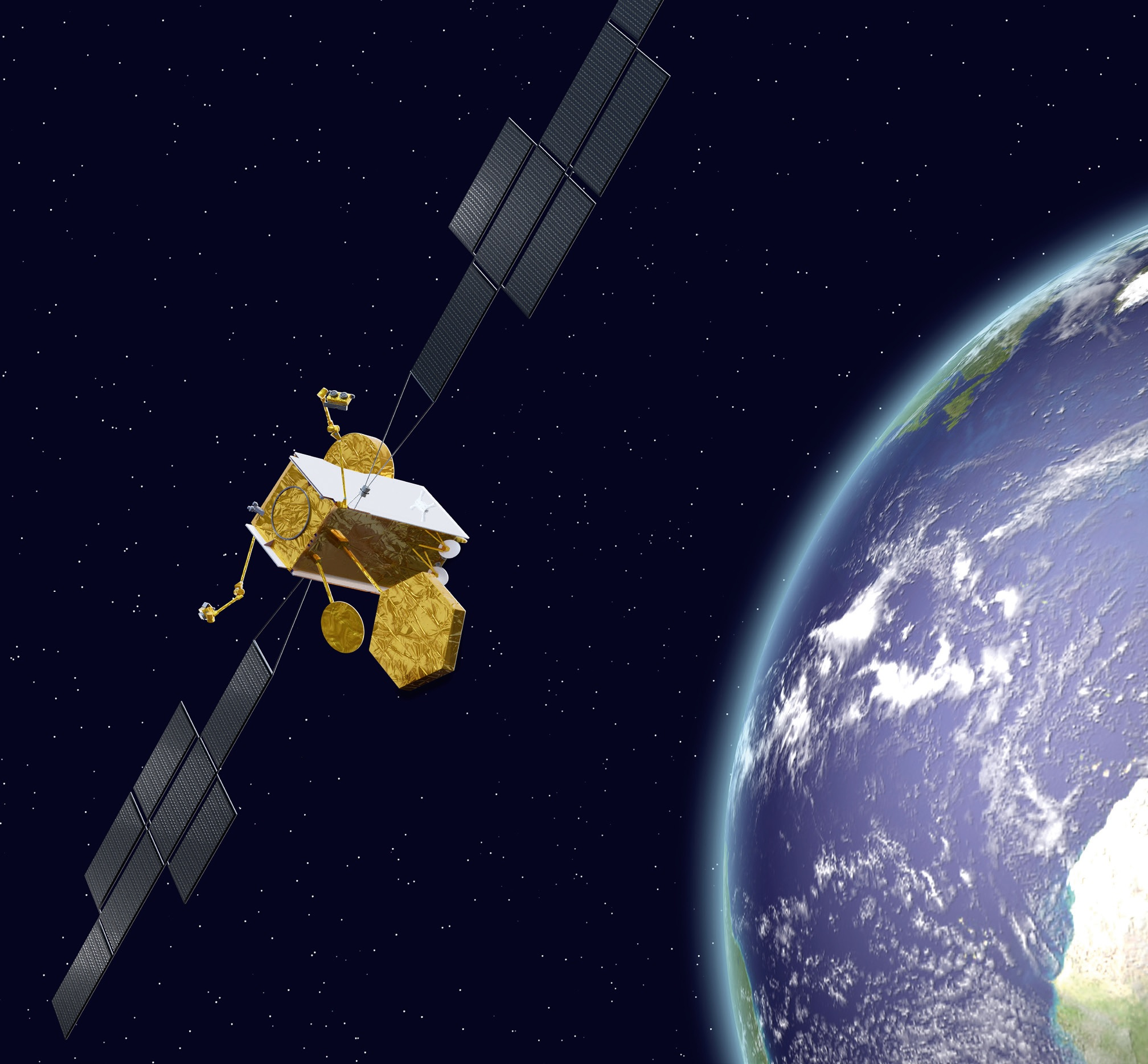
An artist's impression of Skynet 6A in orbit

In 2018, the MOD was specifying the replacement of Skynet 5, whose PFI programme ended in August 2022. Airbus Defence and Space will build a non-competitively sourced Skynet 6A satellite which was planned for a 2025 launch, as a transition to a new architecture. As of 2017, the PFI project was viewed as unlikely to be extended, as PFI contracting was then seen as generally poor value for taxpayers, and it had depleted MOD of satellite expertise which made specifying its replacement difficult.

The Skynet 6A Launch was delayed beyond 2025, and by 2026, Skynet 6A was scheduled for launch aboard a Falcon 9 Block 5A rocket at an undetermined date in 2027. Luke Pollard MP, Minister of State for Defence Readiness and Industry, cited problems with build quality, and third-party supplier issues as reasons for the delays.

Skynet 6A is based on the Airbus Eurostar Neo satellite bus, using electric orbit raising and station keeping propulsion, and built at Airbus Stevenage and Portsmouth, England. It uses more radio frequencies for communication, and will have more capacity and versatility than Skynet 5 satellites. A contract for over £500 million was agreed in July 2020, including launch, testing and related ground operations improvements. Due to the delay in agreeing the Skynet 6A contract, preliminary contracts for initial design and to manufacture long lead items had been agreed earlier to prevent end-date slippage. Manufacture of 6A started in October 2021, and a Falcon 9 launch was booked with SpaceX for 2025.

In 2021, a one-year transition was expected to start from the Airbus PFI contract to the new Service Delivery Wrap contract which will operate ground stations until a new generation of satellites under an Enduring Capability contract are launched from about 2028. This transition was expected to cost about £6 billion.

In February 2023, Babcock International won the Service Delivery Wrap support contract to operate and manage Skynet, including the ground infrastructure and integrating new user terminals, for six years from March 2024 at a cost of £400 million.

In 2024, Airbus was given an 18-year contract for the design, manufacture and support of capability enhanced ground modems for communication with Skynet including the forthcoming Skynet 6A satellite. It will be a software-defined radio system capable of processing multiple waveforms on all commonly-used frequencies, including X-band.

==== Skynet 6 future vision ====
The vision for Skynet 6 is a flexible system architecture that combines UK government, allied and commercial satellites. The MOD has become a user of U.S. military constellations Advanced Extremely High Frequency (AEHF) and the Wideband Global Satcom (WGS) systems, and may become a partner in the Mobile User Objective System (MUOS). Part of the enhanced capability would be to support data links to unmanned aerial vehicles and F-35B Lightning II aircraft.

Skynet is the large part of the MOD Future Beyond Line of Sight Satellite Communications programme (FBLOS), which extends to 2041, and has four elements:

- Skynet 6A, a single transition satellite
- Service Delivery Wrap, a support contract to manage and control the Skynet constellation and ground infrastructure
- Skynet 6 Enduring Capability, to provide and operate communication satellites and ground infrastructure into the future
- Secure Telemetry, Tracking and Command (STT&C), to provide assured UK control and management of satellites and their payloads into the future

On 3 July 2020, the UK Government announced that it had acquired a 45% stake in the OneWeb low Earth orbit satellite communications company, for US$500 million including a golden share to give it control over any future ownership sale. Analysts believed OneWeb could be incorporated into the Skynet 6 architecture. OneWeb satellites are already manufactured by a joint venture including Airbus Defence and Space, which positions the current Skynet operator well for future involvement in Skynet 6.

During 2023 contractors were preparing to bid on the SkyNet Enduring Capability (Skynet 6EC) programme, which was split into two contracts: the major one to deliver a constellation of up to three geostationary wideband satellite systems for launch from 2028 to 2030, and a smaller contract for a narrowband service for tactical battlefield access. The narrowband satellite contract was subsequently cancelled under the MOD's 2026 Defence Investment Plan, leaving the Skynet 6EC programme consisting of just the wideband satellites.

In 2025, Amazon subsidiary Kuiper Systems was given a contract to study an advanced communications architecture using "translator" satellites to bridge between military, government and private satellites. U.S. DARPA has been working on a similar architecture. As of late 2025, the exact form of the new Skynet 6 architecture is still under discussion. In July 2026, the National Infrastructure and Service Transformation Authority gave a red confidence rating on the Skynet 6 project, which indicates "major issues with project definition, schedule, budget, quality and/or benefits delivery, which at this stage do not appear to be manageable or resolvable" primarily because of workforce shortages and delays in the Skynet 6a development.

As of May 2025, non-MOD-owned satellite capacity was being sought to augment Skynet. As of September 2026, the MOD had purchased about 1,000 SpaceX Starshield terminals, offering a military-grade service, and about 500 SpaceX Starlink civilian terminals for morale, welfare, recreation and training purposes. Dedicated Starshield terminals were first purchased in 2025.

In January 2026, the Financial Times reported that Airbus and Lockheed Martin were the lead prospective contractors for the full Skynet 6 programme, but there was concern in government over the wisdom of selecting U.S. headquartered Lockheed Martin as the U.S. government was becoming unpredictable under President Trump, especially the threats to annex Greenland.

In 2026, the MOD announced it would build a remotely-operated satellite monitoring facility in Cyprus, Noctis-2, which would monitor Skynet satellites optically and possibly in the infrared for interference.

== Satellite summary ==
Summary
Model	Manufacturer	Launch date	Launch vehicle	End of service	GSO position in 2017	Comments
Skynet 1
1A	Philco Ford	22 November 1969	Delta M	1971	105° West	Non-operational, not re-orbited
1B	Philco Ford	19 August 1970	Delta M	launch failure		Apogee motor failure, did not orbit
Skynet 2
2A	Marconi Space Systems	19 January 1974	Delta 2000	launch failure		Rocket guidance failure, re-entry on 25 January 1974
2B	Marconi Space Systems	23 November 1974	Delta 2000	~1994	~8° East	Uncontrolled, not re-orbited
Skynet 4 Stage 1
4A	British Aerospace	1 January 1990	Commercial Titan III	2005	–	Launched with JCSAT-2, re-orbited in supersynchronous orbit on 20 June 2005
4B	British Aerospace	11 December 1988	Ariane 44LP	1998	–	Launched with Astra 1A, re-orbited 150 km above GSO in June 1998
4C	British Aerospace	30 August 1990	Ariane 44LP		33° East	From about 2017 providing service to the Amundsen–Scott South Pole Station
Skynet 4 Stage 2
4D	Matra Marconi Space (Note: Marconi Space Systems merged to form Matra Marconi Space in 1990. MMS acquired BAe Space Systems in 1994)	10 January 1998	Delta 7000	2008	–	Replaced 4B, re-orbited in a supersynchronous orbit on 28 January 2008
4E	Matra Marconi Space	26 February 1998	Ariane 44L		6° East	
4F	Astrium (Note: In 2000 MMS merged with DASA's space division to form Astrium.)	7 February 2001	Ariane 44L		34° West	
Skynet 5
5A	EADS Astrium (Note: BAE Systems sold its 25% share of Astrium, renamed EADS Astrium)	11 March 2007	Ariane 5ECA		95° East (prev. 6° East)	Launched with Insat 4B. Moved in 2015 to extend Skynet coverage eastward to the western Pacific.
5B	EADS Astrium	14 November 2007	Ariane 5ECA		25° East (prev. 53° East)	Launched with Star One C1
5C	EADS Astrium	12 June 2008	Ariane 5ECA		17.8° West	Launched with Turksat 3A
5D	EADS Astrium	19 December 2012	Ariane 5ECA		53° East	Launched with MEXSAT-3
Skynet 6
6A	Airbus Defence and Space	Planned 2027	Falcon 9 Block 5			

== See also ==
- British Army communications and reconnaissance equipment § Satellite communications
- British space programme
- Defence Intelligence Fusion Centre
- Defense Satellite Communications System
- IRIS²
- Reacher Satellite Ground Terminal
- Syracuse (satellite)
- TACOMSAT
