= Skynet 5A =

British military communications satellite

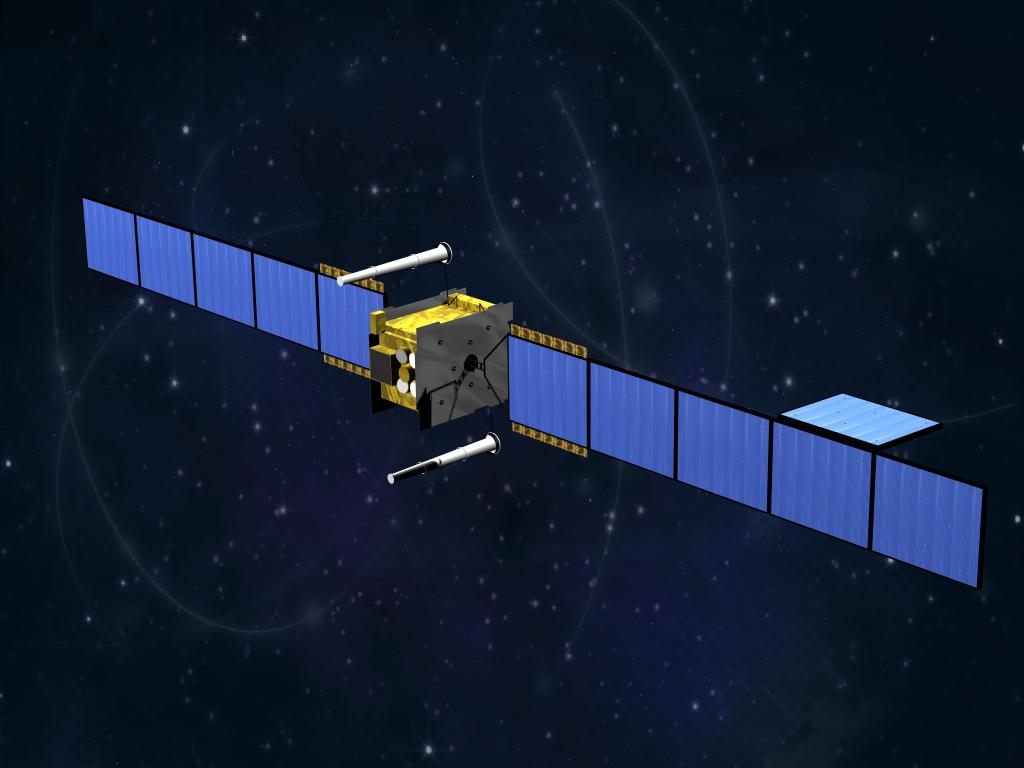
- Mission type: Military communications
- Operator: Paradigm Secure Communications; EADS Astrium; On behalf of British Ministry of Defence
- COSPAR ID: 2007-007B
- SATCAT no.: 30794
- Mission duration: 15 years

Spacecraft properties
- Manufacturer: EADS Astrium
- Launch mass: 4,700 kilograms (10,400 lb)

Start of mission
- Launch date: 11 March 2007
- Rocket: Ariane 5ECA
- Launch site: Kourou ELA-3
- Contractor: Arianespace

Orbital parameters
- Reference system: Geocentric
- Regime: Geosynchronous

Skynet 5A is the first in a series of new-generation Skynet military communications satellites, used by the British Ministry of Defence. It was launched aboard an Ariane 5 carrier rocket at 22:03 GMT on 11 March 2007.

== Launch ==
Skynet 5A was one of two payloads orbited by the first Arianespace Ariane 5 launch of 2007. India's INSAT 4B communications satellite was launched on the same rocket.

It was originally planned for launch on 10 March, but due to a problem with a sensor controlling the launch pad water deluge system, the launch was delayed one day.

== Construction ==
Skynet 5A was built by EADS Astrium, who also selected Ariane 5 as the carrier rocket to launch all three Skynet 5-series satellites. Their design is based on the Eurostar E3000 satellite bus.

== Use ==
Skynet 5A is being used to provide secure communications services for the British armed forces and NATO. Skynet 5A had a launch mass of 4.7 tonnes, and operates with a payload power of 5 kilowatts, four times more than the previous-generation Skynet 4 satellites.

It is operated by Paradigm Secure Communications, a commercial organisation which is a wholly owned subsidiary of EADS Astrium, on behalf of the United Kingdom's Ministry of Defence.

Skynet 5A was originally stationed at 6 degrees East. In 2015 it was relocated to 95 degrees East to extend the Skynet constellation's coverage over the Indian Ocean and Western Pacific.

== See also ==
- Skynet (satellites)
