= Skynet 5D =

Communications satellite launched 2012

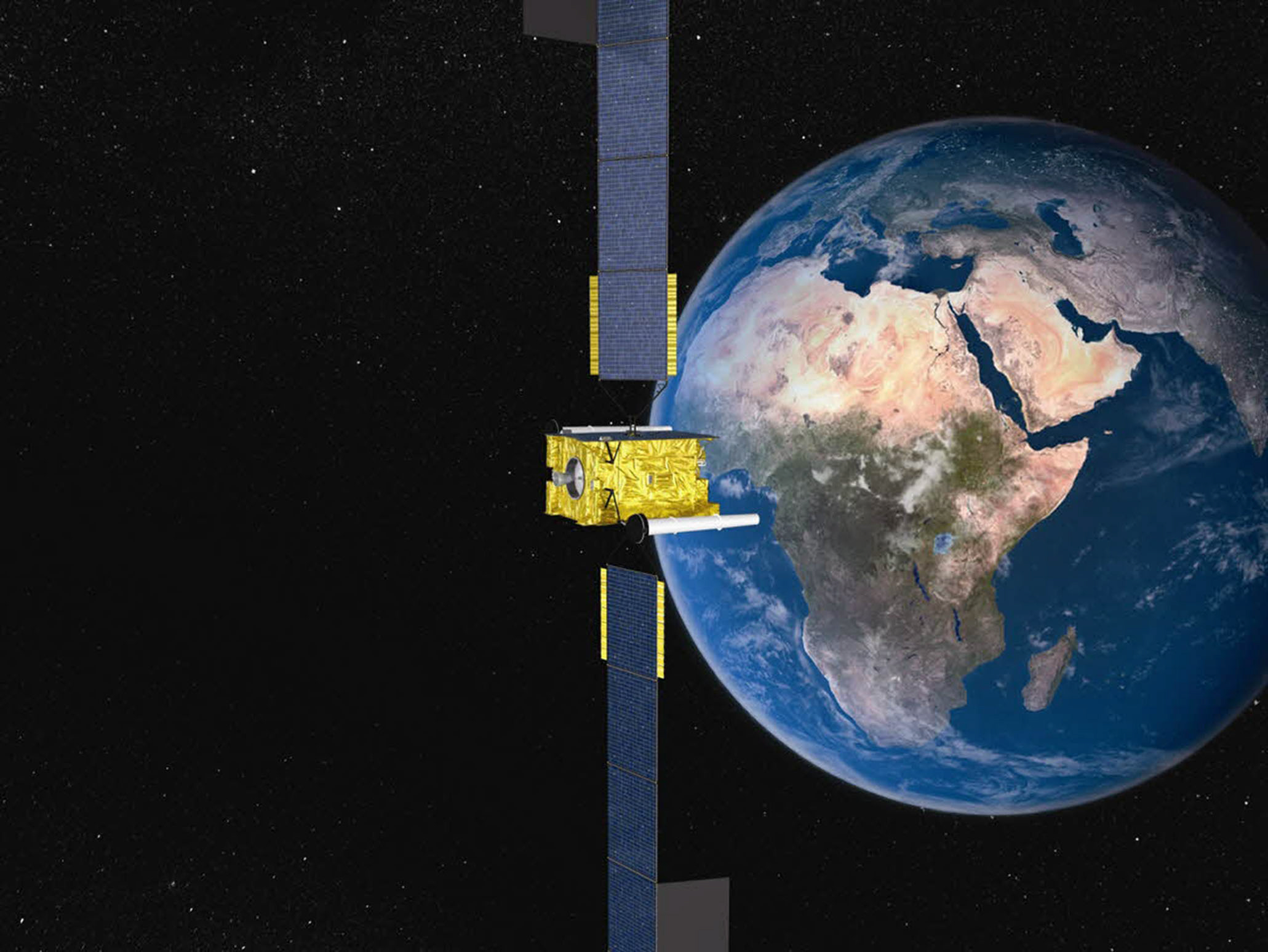
- A CGI impression of Skynet 5D in orbit
- Mission type: Military communications
- Operator: Astrium Services; On behalf of British Ministry of Defence
- COSPAR ID: 2012-075A
- SATCAT no.: 39034
- Mission duration: 15 years

Spacecraft properties
- Bus: Eurostar 3000S
- Manufacturer: Astrium
- Launch mass: 4,800 kilograms (10,600 lb)

Start of mission
- Launch date: 19 December 2012, 21:49 UTC
- Rocket: Ariane 5ECA VA211
- Launch site: Kourou ELA-3
- Contractor: Arianespace

Orbital parameters
- Reference system: Geocentric
- Regime: Geostationary
- Longitude: 53° East

Skynet 5D is a military communications satellite operated by Airbus Defence and Space on behalf of the British Ministry of Defence. It was the last of four Skynet 5 satellites to be launched.

== Spacecraft ==
The Skynet 5D spacecraft was constructed by Astrium, based on the Eurostar 3000S satellite bus. It had a mass at launch of approximately 4,800 kilograms (10,600 lb), and is designed to operate for at least 15 years. Its 34-metre (112 ft) solar arrays will generate a minimum of 6 kilowatts to power its UHF and X-band communications systems. The satellite's payload includes jamming countermeasures.

The Ministry of Defence described the satellite as having a "key role in gathering intelligence on operations", as well as communications.

== Launch ==
Skynet 5D was launched by an Ariane 5ECA carrier rocket flying from ELA-3 at Kourou. The launch occurred at 21:49 UTC on 19 December 2012. Skynet 5D was one of two satellites aboard the rocket, the other being Mexsat Bicentenario, which was located below it; Skynet 5D was mounted atop a Sylda 5 adaptor.

== Orbit ==
The launch placed Skynet 5D into a geosynchronous transfer orbit, from which was planned to raise itself into geostationary orbit. The spacecraft was expected to be placed at a longitude of 25 degrees East.
