= List of Indian satellites =

This list covers most artificial satellites built and operated by the Republic of India. India has been successfully launching satellites of various types from 1975. Apart from Indian rockets, these satellites have been launched from various vehicles, including American, Russian, and European rockets sometimes as well. The organization responsible for India's national space programme is ISRO and it has historically shouldered the bulk of the responsibility of designing, building, launching, and operating these satellites. However since early 2020s, India's private space sector has rapidly expanded and played increasingly greater roles in development of spacecraft, launch vehicles, deep tech, supporting services and proplusion systems.

== Legend ==
This is a list of Indian (wholly or partially owned, wholly or partially designed and/or manufactured) satellites and orbital space crafts, both operated by the Indian government (ISRO, Indian defence forces, other government agencies) or private (educational and research) entities. All satellite launches marked successful have completed at least one full orbital flight (no sub-orbital flights have been included in this list).

Mission status/type legend

- Mission failure (due to launch vehicle failure (at launch/during transit))
- Extra-terrestrial missions
- Geosynchronous Orbit (inclination ≥ 5°)
- Geostationary Orbit (inclination < 5°)
- Crewed spacecraft

== 1970s ==
Indian space missions began in the 1970s, with Soviet assistance in launching the first two satellites.

Payload Details						Launch Date	Launch Vehicle	Launch Site	Details							Refs (Official portal)
#	Name	Discipline	COSPAR ID	Launch Mass	Power	Launch Date	Launch Vehicle	Launch Site	Periapsis	Apoapsis	Period	Inclination	Longitude^{‡}	Epoch Start	Decay Date	Refs (Official portal)
#	Name	Discipline	SatCat #	Dry Mass	Power	Launch Date	Launch Vehicle	Launch Site	Periapsis	Apoapsis	Period	Inclination	Longitude^{‡}	Epoch Start	Decay Date	Refs (Official portal)
1	Aryabhata	Earth Sciences; Space Physics	1975-033A	360 kg (790 lb)	46 W	19 April 1975, 13:10:00 IST	(Soviet Union) Cosmos-3M	(Soviet Union) Kapustin Yar	Active technological experience in building and operating a satellite system. This was India's first indigenously designed and built satellite.							
1	Aryabhata	Earth Sciences; Space Physics	07752	–	46 W	19 April 1975, 13:10:00 IST	(Soviet Union) Cosmos-3M	(Soviet Union) Kapustin Yar	568 km (353 mi)	611 km (380 mi)	96.5 minutes	50.7°		19 April 1975, 01:30:00 IST	11 February 1992	
2	Bhaskara; Sega-I	Astronomy; Communications; Engineering; Earth Sciences	1979-051A	444 kg (979 lb)	47 W	7 June 1979, 16:00:00 IST	(Soviet Union) Modified SS-5 (SKean IRBM) plus Upper Stage	(Soviet Union) Kapustin Yar	First experimental remote sensing satellite. Carried TV and microwave cameras.							
2	Bhaskara; Sega-I	Astronomy; Communications; Engineering; Earth Sciences	11392	–	47 W	7 June 1979, 16:00:00 IST	(Soviet Union) Modified SS-5 (SKean IRBM) plus Upper Stage	(Soviet Union) Kapustin Yar	512 km (318 mi)	557 km (346 mi)	95.2 minutes	50.7°		7 June 1979, 01:30:00 IST	17 February 1989	
3	Rohini; Technology; Payload	Experimental	Not Applicable	35 kg (77 lb)	3 W	10 August 1979	(India) SLV-3-E1	(India) Satish Dhawan Space Centre, Sriharikota	Intended for measuring in-flight performance of first experimental flight of SLV-3, the first Indian launch vehicle. Did not achieve orbit.							
3	Rohini; Technology; Payload	Experimental	Not Applicable	–	3 W	10 August 1979	(India) SLV-3-E1	(India) Satish Dhawan Space Centre, Sriharikota	Not Applicable	Not Applicable	Not Applicable	Not Applicable		Not Applicable	Not Applicable	

^{†} In case of discrepancy in data between sources, N2YO and NASA NSSDCA is taken as the source of truth.
^{‡} Orbital Longitude is applicable only for Geostationary and Geosynchronous satellites.

== 1980s ==
India had three continuous successful satellite launches from its first generation rocket SLV. ISRO had two running projects for next generation rockets based on SLV:

- ASLV to study and develop technologies to transfer satellites into geostationary orbit.
- PSLV to transfer higher payloads into polar and Sun synchronous orbits.

ISRO did not have enough funds to run both projects simultaneously. Initial setbacks complexity led ISRO to terminate ASLV in just initial flights and focus on PSLV. Technologies to launch geostationary satellites arrived only in 2000s.

Payload Details						Launch Date	Launch Vehicle	Launch Site	Details							Refs (Official portal)
#	Name	Discipline	COSPAR ID	Launch Mass	Power	Launch Date	Launch Vehicle	Launch Site	Periapsis	Apoapsis	Period	Inclination	Longitude^{‡}	Epoch Start	Decay Date	Refs (Official portal)
#	Name	Discipline	SatCat #	Dry Mass	Power	Launch Date	Launch Vehicle	Launch Site	Periapsis	Apoapsis	Period	Inclination	Longitude^{‡}	Epoch Start	Decay Date	Refs (Official portal)
4	Rohini RS-1 (Rohini-1B)	Earth Sciences	1980-062A	35 kg (77 lb)	16 W	18 July 1980, 08:01:00 IST	(India) SLV-3-E2	(India) Satish Dhawan Space Centre, Sriharikota	Used for measuring in-flight performance of second experimental launch of SLV-3. This was India's first indigenous satellite launch, making it the seventh nation to possess the capability to launch its own satellites on its own rockets.							
4	Rohini RS-1 (Rohini-1B)	Earth Sciences	11899	–	16 W	18 July 1980, 08:01:00 IST	(India) SLV-3-E2	(India) Satish Dhawan Space Centre, Sriharikota	305 km (190 mi)	919 km (571 mi)	96.9 minutes	44.7°		18 July 1980, 01:30:00 IST	20 May 1981	
5	Rohini RS-D1 (Rohini-2)	Earth Sciences	1981-051A	38 kg (84 lb)	16 W	31 May 1981, 10:30:00 IST	(India) SLV-3-D1	(India) Satish Dhawan Space Centre, Sriharikota	Used for conducting some remote sensing technology studies using a landmark sensor payload. Launched by the first developmental launch of SLV-3.							
5	Rohini RS-D1 (Rohini-2)	Earth Sciences	12491	–	16 W	31 May 1981, 10:30:00 IST	(India) SLV-3-D1	(India) Satish Dhawan Space Centre, Sriharikota	186 km (116 mi)	418 km (260 mi)	90.5 minutes	46.3°		31 May 1981, 01:30:00 IST	8 June 1981	
6	APPLE	Communications	1981-057B	670 kg (1,480 lb)	210 W	19 June 1981, 18:02:59 IST	(European Union) Ariane-1 (V-3)	(French Guiana) Centre Spatial Guyanais, Kourou	First experimental communication satellite. Provided experience in building and operating a payload experiment three-axis stabilised communication satellite.							
6	APPLE	Communications	12545	–	210 W	19 June 1981, 18:02:59 IST	(European Union) Ariane-1 (V-3)	(French Guiana) Centre Spatial Guyanais, Kourou	35,761.9 km (22,221.4 mi)	35,963 km (22,346 mi)	1439.6 minutes	13.6°	97.57° E	19 June 1981, 01:30:00 IST		
7	Bhaskara -II	Engineering; Earth Sciences	1981-115A	444 kg (979 lb)	47 W	20 November 1981, 14:08:00 IST	(Soviet Union) Modified SS-5 (SKean IRBM) plus Upper Stage	(Soviet Union) Kapustin Yar	Second experimental remote sensing satellite; similar to Bhaskara-1. Provided experience in building and operating a remote sensing satellite system on an end-to-end basis.							
7	Bhaskara -II	Engineering; Earth Sciences	12968	–	47 W	20 November 1981, 14:08:00 IST	(Soviet Union) Modified SS-5 (SKean IRBM) plus Upper Stage	(Soviet Union) Kapustin Yar	520 km (320 mi)	542 km (337 mi)	95.2 minutes	50.6°		20 November 1981, 00:30:00 IST	30 November 1991	
8	INSAT-1A	Communications	1982-031A	1,152.1 kg (2,540 lb)	–	10 April 1982, 12:17:00 IST	(United States) Delta 3910 PAM-D	(United States) Air Force Eastern Test Range, Florida	First operational multipurpose communication and meteorology satellite. Procured from USA. Worked for only six months.							
8	INSAT-1A	Communications	13129	–	–	10 April 1982, 12:17:00 IST	(United States) Delta 3910 PAM-D	(United States) Air Force Eastern Test Range, Florida	35,837.1 km (22,268.1 mi)	35,903.1 km (22,309.2 mi)	1440 minutes	13.6°	40.85° E	10 April 1982, 07:17:00 IST		
9	Rohini RS-D2 (Rohini-3)	Earth Sciences	1983-033A	41.5 kg (91 lb)	16 W	17 April 1983, 11:14:00 IST	(India) SLV-3	(India) Satish Dhawan Space Centre, Sriharikota	Identical to RS-D1. Launched by the second developmental launch of SLV-3.							
9	Rohini RS-D2 (Rohini-3)	Earth Sciences	14002	–	16 W	17 April 1983, 11:14:00 IST	(India) SLV-3	(India) Satish Dhawan Space Centre, Sriharikota	389 km (242 mi)	852 km (529 mi)	97.1 minutes	46.6°	17 April 1983, 00:30:00 IST	19 April 1990		
10	INSAT-1B	Communications; Earth Sciences	1983-089B	1,152 kg (2,540 lb)	–	1 June 1983, 13:19:00 IST	(United States) Shuttle [PAM-D]	(United States) Air Force Eastern Test Range, Florida	Identical to INSAT-1A. Served for more than design life of seven years.							
10	INSAT-1B	Communications; Earth Sciences	14318	–	–	1 June 1983, 13:19:00 IST	(United States) Shuttle [PAM-D]	(United States) Air Force Eastern Test Range, Florida	35,776.2 km (22,230.3 mi)	35,869.6 km (22,288.3 mi)	1437.6 minutes	14.8°	89.71° E	31 May 1983, 09:19:00 IST		
11	SROSS-1	Experimental	Not Applicable	150 kg (330 lb)	90 W	24 March 1987	(India) ASLV-D1	(India) Satish Dhawan Space Centre, Sriharikota	Carried payload for launch vehicle performance monitoring and for gamma ray astronomy. Did not achieve orbit.							
11	SROSS-1	Experimental	Not Applicable	–	90 W	24 March 1987	(India) ASLV-D1	(India) Satish Dhawan Space Centre, Sriharikota	Not Applicable	Not Applicable	Not Applicable	Not Applicable		Not Applicable	Not Applicable	
12	IRS-1A	Earth Sciences	1988-021A	975 kg (2,150 lb)	600 W	17 March 1988, 12:42:00 IST	(Soviet Union) Vostok	(Soviet Union) Baikonur Cosmodrome, Kazakhstan	Earth observation satellite. First operational remote sensing satellite.							
12	IRS-1A	Earth Sciences	18960	–	600 W	17 March 1988, 12:42:00 IST	(Soviet Union) Vostok	(Soviet Union) Baikonur Cosmodrome, Kazakhstan	902.3 km (560.7 mi)	922.1 km (573.0 mi)	103.1 minutes	99.3°		17 March 1988, 00:30:00 IST		
13	SROSS-2	Astronomy; Space Physics	Not Applicable	150 kg (330 lb)	90 W	13 July 1988	(India) ASLV-D2	(India) Satish Dhawan Space Centre, Sriharikota	Carried remote sensing payload of German space agency in addition to Gamma Ray astronomy payload. Did not achieve orbit.							
13	SROSS-2	Astronomy; Space Physics	Not Applicable	–	90 W	13 July 1988	(India) ASLV-D2	(India) Satish Dhawan Space Centre, Sriharikota	Not Applicable	Not Applicable	Not Applicable	Not Applicable		Not Applicable	Not Applicable	
14	INSAT-1C	Communications; Earth Sciences	1988-063A	1,152 kg (2,540 lb)	–	22 July 1988, 04:42:00 IST	(European Union) Ariane-3	(French Guiana) Centre Spatial Guyanais, Kourou	Same as INSAT-1A. Served for only one-and-a-half years.							
14	INSAT-1C	Communications; Earth Sciences	19330	–	–	22 July 1988, 04:42:00 IST	(European Union) Ariane-3	(French Guiana) Centre Spatial Guyanais, Kourou	35,768.8 km (22,225.7 mi)	35,821.5 km (22,258.4 mi)	1436.2 minutes	14.9°	95.03° E	22 July 1988, 00:42:00 IST		

^{†} In case of discrepancy in data between sources, N2YO and NASA NSSDCA is taken as the source of truth.
^{‡} Orbital Longitude is applicable only for Geostationary and Geosynchronous satellites.

== 1990s ==
From this decade on, Polar Satellite Launch Vehicle (PSLV) arrived that allowed India to become self-reliant in launching most of its remote sensing satellites. However, for heavy geostationary systems, India continued to remain dependent on Europe entirely. Capability to launch geostationary satellites will arrive in next decade.

Payload Details						Launch Date	Launch Vehicle	Launch Site	Details									Refs (Official portal)
#	Name	Discipline	COSPAR ID	Launch Mass	Power	Launch Date	Launch Vehicle	Launch Site	Periapsis	Apoapsis	Semi-Major Axis	Period	Inclination	Longitude^{‡}	Eccentricity	Epoch Start	Decay Date	Refs (Official portal)
#	Name	Discipline	SatCat #	Dry Mass	Power	Launch Date	Launch Vehicle	Launch Site	Periapsis	Apoapsis	Semi-Major Axis	Period	Inclination	Longitude^{‡}	Eccentricity	Epoch Start	Decay Date	Refs (Official portal)
15	INSAT-1D	Communications; Earth Sciences	1990-051A	1,190 kg (2,620 lb)	1000 W	12 June 1990, 11:22:00 IST	(United States) Delta 4925	(United States) Air Force Eastern Test Range, Florida	Identical to INSAT-1A. Still in service. A third stage motor from its launch landed in Australia in 2008.									
15	INSAT-1D	Communications; Earth Sciences	20643	550 kg (1,210 lb)	1000 W	12 June 1990, 11:22:00 IST	(United States) Delta 4925	(United States) Air Force Eastern Test Range, Florida	35,729.2 km (22,201.1 mi)	35,974 km (22,353 mi)	42,160 km (26,200 mi)	1435.9 minutes	14.3°	71.66° E	0.00245	12 June 1990, 01:30:00 IST	–	
16	IRS-1B	Earth Sciences	1991-061A	975 kg (2,150 lb)	600 W	29 August 1991, 12:18:00 IST	(Soviet Union) Vostok	(Soviet Union) Baikonur Cosmodrome, Kazakhstan	Earth observation satellite. Improved version of IRS-1A.									
16	IRS-1B	Earth Sciences	21688	–	600 W	29 August 1991, 12:18:00 IST	(Soviet Union) Vostok	(Soviet Union) Baikonur Cosmodrome, Kazakhstan	892.6 km (554.6 mi)	928 km (577 mi)	7,281 km (4,524 mi)	103.1 minutes	99.0°	Not Applicable	0.00385	29 August 1991, 01:30:00 IST	–	
17	INSAT-2DT (Formerly ARABSAT-1C) (INSAT-2R)	Communications	1992-010B	1,310 kg (2,890 lb)	1400 W	27 February 1992, 05:28:10 IST	(European Union) Ariane-44L H10	(French Guiana) Centre Spatial Guyanais, Kourou	Launched as Arabsat 1C. Procured in orbit from Arabsat in January 1998.									
17	INSAT-2DT (Formerly ARABSAT-1C) (INSAT-2R)	Communications	21894	–	1400 W	27 February 1992, 05:28:10 IST	(European Union) Ariane-44L H10	(French Guiana) Centre Spatial Guyanais, Kourou	36,122.8 km (22,445.7 mi)	36,365.4 km (22,596.4 mi)	42,615 km (26,480 mi)	1459.2 minutes	11.6°	21.41° W	0.00385	29 August 1991, 01:30:00 IST	–	
18	SROSS-C (SROSS-3)	Astronomy; Earth Sciences; Space Physics	1992-028A	106.1 kg (234 lb)	45 W	20 May 1992, 08:30:00 IST	(India) ASLV-D3	(India) Satish Dhawan Space Centre, Sriharikota	Carried gamma ray astronomy and aeronomy payload.									
18	SROSS-C (SROSS-3)	Astronomy; Earth Sciences; Space Physics	21968	–	45 W	20 May 1992, 08:30:00 IST	(India) ASLV-D3	(India) Satish Dhawan Space Centre, Sriharikota	255 km (158 mi)	429 km (267 mi)	–	91 minutes	46.03°	Not Applicable	0.01295	21 May 1992, 01:30:00 IST	14 July 1992	
19	INSAT-2A	Communications; Earth Sciences	1992-041A	1,906 kg (4,202 lb)	~ 1000 W	10 July 1992, 04:12:19 IST	(European Union) Ariane-44L H10	(French Guiana) Centre Spatial Guyanais, Kourou	First satellite in the second-generation Indian-built INSAT-2 series. Has enhanced capability over INSAT-1 series. Still in service.									
19	INSAT-2A	Communications; Earth Sciences	22027	916 kg (2,019 lb)	~ 1000 W	10 July 1992, 04:12:19 IST	(European Union) Ariane-44L H10	(French Guiana) Centre Spatial Guyanais, Kourou	35,783.1 km (22,234.6 mi)	35,846.9 km (22,274.2 mi)	42,186 km (26,213 mi)	1437.2 minutes	14.5°	16.18° E	0.00381	10 July 1992, 01:30:00 IST	–	
20	INSAT-2B	Communications; Earth Sciences	1993-048B	1,931 kg (4,257 lb)	~ 1000 W	23 July 1993, 04:29:00 IST	(European Union) Ariane-44L H10+	(French Guiana) Centre Spatial Guyanais, Kourou	Second satellite in INSAT-2 series. Identical to INSAT-2A. Still in service.									
20	INSAT-2B	Communications; Earth Sciences	22724	916 kg (2,019 lb)	~ 1000 W	23 July 1993, 04:29:00 IST	(European Union) Ariane-44L H10+	(French Guiana) Centre Spatial Guyanais, Kourou	35,812.9 km (22,253.1 mi)	35,941.2 km (22,332.8 mi)	42,248 km (26,252 mi)	1440.4 minutes	13.0°	156.74° W	–	–	–	
21	IRS-1E	Earth Sciences	Not Applicable	846 kg (1,865 lb)	41.5 W	20 September 1993	(India) PSLV-D1	(India) Satish Dhawan Space Centre, Sriharikota	Earth observation satellite. Did not achieve orbit.									
21	IRS-1E	Earth Sciences	Not Applicable	–	41.5 W	20 September 1993	(India) PSLV-D1	(India) Satish Dhawan Space Centre, Sriharikota	Not Applicable	Not Applicable	Not Applicable	Not Applicable	Not Applicable	Not Applicable	Not Applicable	Not Applicable	Not Applicable	
22	SROSS-C2	Astronomy; Space Physics	1994-027A	113 kg (249 lb)	45 W	5 May 1994, 05:30:00 IST	(India) ASLV-D4	(India) Satish Dhawan Space Centre, Sriharikota	Identical to SROSS-C.									
22	SROSS-C2	Astronomy; Space Physics	23099	–	45 W	5 May 1994, 05:30:00 IST	(India) ASLV-D4	(India) Satish Dhawan Space Centre, Sriharikota	433 km (269 mi)	917 km (570 mi)	–	98.1 minutes	46.0°	Not Applicable	0.03431	4 May 1994, 01:30:00 IST	12 July 2001	
23	IRS-P2	Earth Sciences	1994-068A	870 kg (1,920 lb)	510 W	15 October 1994, 10:38:00 IST	(India) PSLV-D2	(India) Satish Dhawan Space Centre, Sriharikota	Earth observation satellite. Launched by second developmental flight of PSLV. Mission accomplished after 3 years of service in 1997.									
23	IRS-P2	Earth Sciences	23323	–	510 W	15 October 1994, 10:38:00 IST	(India) PSLV-D2	(India) Satish Dhawan Space Centre, Sriharikota	819.2 km (509.0 mi)	820.8 km (510.0 mi)	7,190 km (4,470 mi)	101.1 minutes	98.8°	Not Applicable	0.00533	15 October 1994, 06:38:00 IST	–	
24	INSAT-2C	Communications	1995-067B	2,050 kg (4,520 lb)	1320 W	7 December 1995, 04:53:00 IST	(European Union) Ariane-44L H10-3	(French Guiana) Centre Spatial Guyanais, Kourou	Has additional capabilities such as mobile satellite service, business communication and television outreach beyond Indian boundaries. Still in service.									
24	INSAT-2C	Communications	23731	946 kg (2,086 lb)	1320 W	7 December 1995, 04:53:00 IST	(European Union) Ariane-44L H10-3	(French Guiana) Centre Spatial Guyanais, Kourou	35,918.4 km (22,318.7 mi)	35,948.5 km (22,337.4 mi)	42,304 km (26,286 mi)	1443.2 minutes	12.0°	60.57° E	–	–	–	
25	IRS-1C	Earth Sciences	1995-072A	1,250 kg (2,760 lb)	809 W	28 December 1995, 12:15:00 IST	(Russia) Molniya-M	Baikonur Cosmodrome, Kazakhstan	Earth observation satellite. Launched from Baikonur Cosmodrome.									
25	IRS-1C	Earth Sciences	23751	–	809 W	28 December 1995, 12:15:00 IST	(Russia) Molniya-M	Baikonur Cosmodrome, Kazakhstan	823 km (511 mi)	824.9 km (512.6 mi)	7,194 km (4,470 mi)	101.2 minutes	98.69°	Not Applicable	0.00014	28 December 1995, 7:15:00 IST	–	
26	IRS-P3 (IRS B3)	Astronomy; Earth Sciences	1996-017A	930 kg (2,050 lb)	817 W	21 March 1996, 10:03:00 IST	(India) PSLV-D3	(India) Satish Dhawan Space Centre, Sriharikota, Andhra Pradesh	Earth observation satellite. Carries remote sensing payload and an X-ray astronomy payload. Launched by third developmental flight of PSLV									
26	IRS-P3 (IRS B3)	Astronomy; Earth Sciences	23827	–	817 W	21 March 1996, 10:03:00 IST	(India) PSLV-D3	(India) Satish Dhawan Space Centre, Sriharikota, Andhra Pradesh	820.9 km (510.1 mi)	827.1 km (513.9 mi)	7,195 km (4,471 mi)	101.2 mins	98.7°	Not Applicable	0.00319	21 March 1996, 5:23:00 IST	–	
27	INSAT-2D	Communications	1997-027B	2,079 kg (4,583 lb)	1650 W	4 June 1997, 4:50:00 IST	(European Union) Ariane-44L H10-3	(French Guiana) Centre Spatial Guyanais, Kourou	Same as INSAT-2C. Inoperable since 4 October 1997 due to power bus anomaly									
27	INSAT-2D	Communications	24820	995 kg (2,194 lb)	1650 W	4 June 1997, 4:50:00 IST	(European Union) Ariane-44L H10-3	(French Guiana) Centre Spatial Guyanais, Kourou	33,225.6 km (20,645.4 mi)	35,917.5 km (22,318.1 mi)	40,942 km (25,440 mi)	1374.1 mins	13.5°	125.76° E	–	–	–	
28	IRS-1D	Earth Sciences	1997-057A	920 kg (2,030 lb)	809 W	29 September 1997, 10:17:00 IST	(India) PSLV-C1	(India) Satish Dhawan Space Centre, Sriharikota, Andhra Pradesh	Earth observation satellite. Same as IRS-1C									
28	IRS-1D	Earth Sciences	24971	–	809 W	29 September 1997, 10:17:00 IST	(India) PSLV-C1	(India) Satish Dhawan Space Centre, Sriharikota, Andhra Pradesh	748.6 km (465.2 mi)	823.3 km (511.6 mi)	7,156 km (4,447 mi)	100.4 mins	98.4°	Not Applicable	0.03719	29 September 1997, 6:17:00 IST	–	
29	INSAT-2E (APR-1)	Communications; Earth Sciences	1999-016A	2,550 kg (5,620 lb)	–	2 April 1999, 8:30:00 IST	(European Union) Ariane-42P H10-3	(French Guiana) Centre Spatial Guyanais, Kourou	Multipurpose communication and meteorological satellite									
29	INSAT-2E (APR-1)	Communications; Earth Sciences	25666	1,150 kg (2,540 lb)	–	2 April 1999, 8:30:00 IST	(European Union) Ariane-42P H10-3	(French Guiana) Centre Spatial Guyanais, Kourou	35,932.1 km (22,327.2 mi)	36,003.3 km (22,371.4 mi)	42,338 km (26,308 mi)	1445 mins	5.3°	107.82° E	–	–	–	
30	OceanSat-1 (IRS-P4)	Earth Sciences	1999-029C	1,050 kg (2,310 lb)	750 W	26 May 1999, 11:52:00 IST	(India) PSLV-C2	(India) Satish Dhawan Space Centre, Sriharikota, Andhra Pradesh	Earth observation satellite. Carries an Ocean Colour Monitor (OCM) and a Multifrequency Scanning Microwave Radiometer (MSMR)									
30	OceanSat-1 (IRS-P4)	Earth Sciences	25758	–	750 W	26 May 1999, 11:52:00 IST	(India) PSLV-C2	(India) Satish Dhawan Space Centre, Sriharikota, Andhra Pradesh	723.9 km (449.8 mi)	726.3 km (451.3 mi)	7,096 km (4,409 mi)	99.1 mins	98.2°	Not Applicable	0.00077	26 May 1999, 8:12:00 IST	–	

^{†} In case of discrepancy in data between sources, N2YO and NASA NSSDCA is taken as the source of truth.
^{‡} Orbital Longitude is applicable only for Geostationary and Geosynchronous satellites.

== 2000s ==
ISRO's workhorse, the PSLV, became the mainstay for successful launches of indigenous satellites from India during this decade. India successfully launched 11 geostationary or geosynchronous satellites during this period, which was equal to the total number of similar launches in the previous 2 decades put together. India's first extra terrestrial mission was also successfully executed during this period.

Payload Details						Launch Date	Launch Vehicle	Launch Site	Details									Refs (Official portal)
#	Name	Discipline	COSPAR ID	Launch Mass	On-board Power	Launch Date	Launch Vehicle	Launch Site	Periapsis	Apoapsis	Semi-Major Axis	Period	Inclination	Longitude^{‡}	Eccentricity	Epoch Start	Decay Date	Refs (Official portal)
#	Name	Discipline	SatCat #	Dry Mass	On-board Power	Launch Date	Launch Vehicle	Launch Site	Periapsis	Apoapsis	Semi-Major Axis	Period	Inclination	Longitude^{‡}	Eccentricity	Epoch Start	Decay Date	Refs (Official portal)
31	INSAT-3B	Communications	2000-016B	2,070 kg (4,560 lb)	1712 W	22 March 2000, 4:59:00 IST	(European Union) Ariane-5G	(French Guiana) Centre Spatial Guyanais, Kourou	Multipurpose communication: business communication, developmental communication, and mobile communications									
31	INSAT-3B	Communications	26108	970 kg (2,140 lb)	1712 W	22 March 2000, 4:59:00 IST	(European Union) Ariane-5G	(French Guiana) Centre Spatial Guyanais, Kourou	35,949.3 km (22,337.9 mi)	35,985.9 km (22,360.6 mi)	42,338 km (26,308 mi)	1445.0 mins	4.3°	107° W	–	30 June 2000, 00:59:00 IST	–	
32	GSAT-1 (GramSat-1)	Communications; Engineering	2001-015A	1,530 kg (3,370 lb)	–	18 April 2001, 15:43:00 IST	(India) GSLV-D1	(India) Satish Dhawan Space Centre, Sriharikota, Andhra Pradesh	Experimental satellite for the first developmental flight of Geosynchronous Satellite Launch Vehicle, GSLV-D1. Did not complete its intended mission due to a shortfall in the GTO apogee									
32	GSAT-1 (GramSat-1)	Communications; Engineering	26745	–	–	18 April 2001, 15:43:00 IST	(India) GSLV-D1	(India) Satish Dhawan Space Centre, Sriharikota, Andhra Pradesh	33,853.1 km (21,035.3 mi)	35,800.5 km (22,245.4 mi)	41,197 km (25,599 mi)	1387 mins	11.2°	17.37° E	0.02261	18 April 2001, 11:43:00 IST	–	
33	TES	Earth Sciences	2001-049A	1,108 kg (2,443 lb)	–	22 October 2001, 10:03:00 IST	(India) PSLV-C3	(India) Satish Dhawan Space Centre, Sriharikota, Andhra Pradesh	Experimental satellite to test technologies such as attitude and orbit control system, high-torque reaction wheels, new reaction control system, etc. This satellite carries a 1-meter resolution panchromatic camera, and is considered a prototype for future Indian "spy satellites"									
33	TES	Earth Sciences	26957	–	–	22 October 2001, 10:03:00 IST	(India) PSLV-C3	(India) Satish Dhawan Space Centre, Sriharikota, Andhra Pradesh	514.6 km (319.8 mi)	570.2 km (354.3 mi)	6,913 km (4,296 mi)	95.3 mins	97.7°	Not Applicable	0.00202	22 October 2002, 6:03:00 IST	–	
34	INSAT-3C	Communications	2002-002A	2,750 kg (6,060 lb)	2765 W	24 January 2002, 5:17:00 IST	(European Union) Ariane-42L H10-3	(French Guiana) Centre Spatial Guyanais, Kourou	Designed to augment the existing INSAT capacity for communication and broadcasting and provide continuity of the services of INSAT-2C									
34	INSAT-3C	Communications	27298	1,218 kg (2,685 lb)	2765 W	24 January 2002, 5:17:00 IST	(European Union) Ariane-42L H10-3	(French Guiana) Centre Spatial Guyanais, Kourou	35,786.9 km (22,236.9 mi)	35,800.6 km (22,245.5 mi)	42,164 km (26,199 mi)	1436.1 mins	0.6°	93.5° E	0.00245	–	–	
35	Kalpana-1 (MetSat-1)	Earth Sciences	2002-043A	1,060 kg (2,340 lb)	550 W	12 September 2002, IST	(India) PSLV-C4	(India) Satish Dhawan Space Centre, Sriharikota, Andhra Pradesh	First meteorological satellite built by ISRO. Originally named METSAT-1, the satellite was subsequently renamed after Kalpana Chawla, who had perished in the Space Shuttle Columbia disaster									
35	Kalpana-1 (MetSat-1)	Earth Sciences	27525	498 kg (1,098 lb)	550 W	12 September 2002, IST	(India) PSLV-C4	(India) Satish Dhawan Space Centre, Sriharikota, Andhra Pradesh	35,741.2 km (22,208.6 mi)	35,845.9 km (22,273.6 mi)	42,166 km (26,201 mi)	1436.1 mins	6.3°	74° E	–	–	–	
36	INSAT-3A	Communications; Earth Sciences	2003-013A	2,950 kg (6,500 lb)	3100 W	10 April 2003, 4:22:00 IST	(European Union) Ariane-5G	(French Guiana) Centre Spatial Guyanais, Kourou	Multipurpose satellite for communication, broadcasting, and meteorological services (similar to INSAT-2E and Kalpana-1)									
36	INSAT-3A	Communications; Earth Sciences	27714	1,348 kg (2,972 lb)	3100 W	10 April 2003, 4:22:00 IST	(European Union) Ariane-5G	(French Guiana) Centre Spatial Guyanais, Kourou	35,874.2 km (22,291.2 mi)	35,980.2 km (22,357.1 mi)	42,298 km (26,283 mi)	1442.9 mins	1.2°	87° E	–	–	–	
37	GSAT-2 (GramSat-2)	Communications	2003-018A	1,900 kg (4,200 lb)	1400 W	8 May 2003, 16:58:00 IST	(India) GSLV-D2	(India) Satish Dhawan Space Centre, Sriharikota, Andhra Pradesh	Experimental satellite for the second developmental test flight of Geosynchronous Satellite Launch Vehicle (GSLV)									
37	GSAT-2 (GramSat-2)	Communications	27807	–	1400 W	8 May 2003, 16:58:00 IST	(India) GSLV-D2	(India) Satish Dhawan Space Centre, Sriharikota, Andhra Pradesh	35,892.6 km (22,302.6 mi)	35,936.5 km (22,329.9 mi)	42,285 km (26,275 mi)	1442.3 mins	5°	199° W	–	–	–	
38	INSAT-3E	Communications	2003-043E	2,775 kg (6,118 lb)	–	28 September 2003, 4:44:00 IST	(European Union) Ariane-5G	(French Guiana) Centre Spatial Guyanais, Kourou	Communication satellite to augment the existing INSAT System									
38	INSAT-3E	Communications	27951	1,218 kg (2,685 lb)	–	28 September 2003, 4:44:00 IST	(European Union) Ariane-5G	(French Guiana) Centre Spatial Guyanais, Kourou	35,576.4 km (22,106.2 mi)	35,716.3 km (22,193.1 mi)	42,017 km (26,108 mi)	1428.6 mins	2.5°	126.83° E	–	28 September 2003 00:44:00 IST	–	
39	ResourceSat-1 (IRS-P6)	Earth Sciences	2003-046A	1,360 kg (3,000 lb)	–	17 October 2003, 10:24:00 IST	(India) PSLV-C5	(India) Satish Dhawan Space Centre, Sriharikota, Andhra Pradesh	Earth observation/remote sensing satellite. Intended to supplement and replace IRS-1C and IRS-1D									
39	ResourceSat-1 (IRS-P6)	Earth Sciences	28051	–	–	17 October 2003, 10:24:00 IST	(India) PSLV-C5	(India) Satish Dhawan Space Centre, Sriharikota, Andhra Pradesh	824.2 km (512.1 mi)	829.5 km (515.4 mi)	7,197 km (4,472 mi)	101.3 mins	2.5°	Not Applicable	0.0016	17 October 2003, 6:24:00 IST	–	
40	GSAT-3 (EduSat)	Communications	2004-036A	1,950.5 kg (4,300 lb)	2040 W	20 September 2004, 16:01:00 IST	(India) GSLV-F01	(India) Satish Dhawan Space Centre, Sriharikota, Andhra Pradesh	Also designated GSAT-3. India's first exclusive educational satellite									
40	GSAT-3 (EduSat)	Communications	28417	819.4 kg (1,806 lb)	2040 W	20 September 2004, 16:01:00 IST	(India) GSLV-F01	(India) Satish Dhawan Space Centre, Sriharikota, Andhra Pradesh	36,071.1 km (22,413.5 mi)	36,084.4 km (22,421.8 mi)	42,446 km (26,375 mi)	1450.6 mins	5.2°	158.51° W	–	–	–	
41	CartoSat-1	Earth Sciences	2005-017A	1,560 kg (3,440 lb)	1100 W	5 May 2005, 10:14:00 IST	(India) PSLV-C6	(India) Satish Dhawan Space Centre, Sriharikota, Andhra Pradesh	Earth observation satellite. Provides stereographic in-orbit images with a 2.5-meter resolution									
41	CartoSat-1	Earth Sciences	28649	–	1100 W	5 May 2005, 10:14:00 IST	(India) PSLV-C6	(India) Satish Dhawan Space Centre, Sriharikota, Andhra Pradesh	623.2 km (387.2 mi)	627.9 km (390.2 mi)	6,996 km (4,347 mi)	97.1 mins	97.9°	Not Applicable	0.00014	5 May 2005, 6:14:00 IST	–	
42	(India) (Netherlands) HamSat	Communications	2005-017B	42.5 kg (94 lb)	–	5 May 2005, 10:14:00 IST	(India) PSLV-C6	(India) Satish Dhawan Space Centre, Sriharikota, Andhra Pradesh	This is a micro-satellite that was built as a collaboration between Indian and Dutch researchers, for providing satellite-based amateur radio services to the national as well as the international community									
42	(India) (Netherlands) HamSat	Communications	28650	–	–	5 May 2005, 10:14:00 IST	(India) PSLV-C6	(India) Satish Dhawan Space Centre, Sriharikota, Andhra Pradesh	592 km (368 mi)	626.4 km (389.2 mi)	6,980 km (4,340 mi)	96.7 mins	97.7°	Not Applicable	0.00271	12 June 1990, 1:30:00 IST	–	
43	INSAT-4A	Communications	2005-049A	3,081 kg (6,792 lb)	5922 W	22 December 2005, 4:03:00 IST	(European Union) Ariane-5GS	(French Guiana) Centre Spatial Guyanais, Kourou	Advanced satellite for direct-to-home television broadcasting services									
43	INSAT-4A	Communications	28911	1,386.55 kg (3,056.8 lb)	5922 W	22 December 2005, 4:03:00 IST	(European Union) Ariane-5GS	(French Guiana) Centre Spatial Guyanais, Kourou	35,789.7 km (22,238.7 mi)	35,798.7 km (22,244.3 mi)	42,165 km (26,200 mi)	1436.1 mins	0.0°	83° E	–	–	–	
44	INSAT-4C	Communications	Not Applicable	2,180 kg (4,810 lb)	–	10 July 2006	(India) GSLV-F02	(India) Satish Dhawan Space Centre, Sriharikota, Andhra Pradesh	Geosynchronous communications satellite. Did not achieve orbit									
44	INSAT-4C	Communications	Not Applicable	–	–	10 July 2006	(India) GSLV-F02	(India) Satish Dhawan Space Centre, Sriharikota, Andhra Pradesh	Not Applicable	Not Applicable	Not Applicable	Not Applicable	Not Applicable	Not Applicable	Not Applicable	Not Applicable	Not Applicable	
45	CartoSat-2 (IRS-P7 or, CartoSat-2AT)	Earth Sciences	2007-001B	680 kg (1,500 lb)	900 W	10 January 2007, 9:27:00 IST	(India) PSLV-C7	(India) Satish Dhawan Space Centre, Sriharikota, Andhra Pradesh	Advanced remote sensing satellite carrying a panchromatic camera capable of providing scene-specific spot images									
45	CartoSat-2 (IRS-P7 or, CartoSat-2AT)	Earth Sciences	29710	–	900 W	10 January 2007, 9:27:00 IST	(India) PSLV-C7	(India) Satish Dhawan Space Centre, Sriharikota, Andhra Pradesh	639.1 km (397.1 mi)	642.2 km (399.0 mi)	7,011 km (4,356 mi)	97.4 mins	97.9°	Not Applicable	0.00143	4 January 2007, 4:27:00 IST	–	
46	SRE-1	Engineering	2007-001C	615 kg (1,356 lb)	–	10 January 2007, 9:27:00 IST	(India) PSLV-C7	(India) Satish Dhawan Space Centre, Sriharikota, Andhra Pradesh	Experimental satellite intended to demonstrate the technology of an orbiting platform for performing experiments in microgravity conditions. Launched as a co-passenger with CARTOSAT-2. SRE-1 was de-orbited and recovered successfully after 12 days over Bay of Bengal									
46	SRE-1	Engineering	29711	550 kg (1,210 lb)	–	10 January 2007, 9:27:00 IST	(India) PSLV-C7	(India) Satish Dhawan Space Centre, Sriharikota, Andhra Pradesh	486 km (302 mi)	643 km (400 mi)	-	95.9 mins	97.9°	Not Applicable	0.01131	4 January 2007, 4:27:00 IST	–	
47	INSAT-4B	Communications	2007-007A	3,025 kg (6,669 lb)	5859 W	12 March 2007, 3:33:00 IST	(European Union) Ariane-5ECA	(French Guiana) Centre Spatial Guyanais, kourou	Identical to INSAT-4A. Further augments the INSAT capacity for direct-to-home (DTH) television services and other communications. On the night of 7 July 2007 INSAT-4B experienced a power supply glitch which led to switching 'off' of 50 per cent of the transponder capacity (6 Ku and 6 C-Band transponders)									
47	INSAT-4B	Communications	30793	–	5859 W	12 March 2007, 3:33:00 IST	(European Union) Ariane-5ECA	(French Guiana) Centre Spatial Guyanais, kourou	35,761.1 km (22,220.9 mi)	35,827.1 km (22,261.9 mi)	42,165 km (26,200 mi)	1436.1 mins	0.0°	93.5° E	–	–	–	
48	PS4 with Advanced Avionics Module (AAM) payload	•Avionics		185 kg		23 April 2007, 10:00	(India) PSLV-C8	(India) Satish Dhawan Space Centre, Sriharikota, Andhra Pradesh										
49	INSAT-4CR	Communications	2007-037A	2,130 kg (4,700 lb)	3000 W	2 September 2007, 18:21:00 IST	(India) GSLV-F04	(India) Satish Dhawan Space Centre, Sriharikota, Andhra Pradesh	Identical to INSAT-4C. It carried 12 high-power Ku-band transponders designed to provide direct-to-home (DTH) television services, Digital Satellite News Gathering etc.									
49	INSAT-4CR	Communications	32050	–	3000 W	2 September 2007, 18:21:00 IST	(India) GSLV-F04	(India) Satish Dhawan Space Centre, Sriharikota, Andhra Pradesh	35,780.2 km (22,232.8 mi)	35,806.9 km (22,249.4 mi)	42,164 km (26,199 mi)	1436.1 mins	0.0°	47.5° E	–	–	–	
50	CartoSat-2A	Earth Sciences	2008-021A	690 kg (1,520 lb)	900 W	28 April 2008, 9:24:00 IST	(India) PSLV-C9	(India) Satish Dhawan Space Centre, Sriharikota, Andhra Pradesh	Earth observation/remote sensing satellite. Identical to CARTOSAT-2									
50	CartoSat-2A	Earth Sciences	32783	–	900 W	28 April 2008, 9:24:00 IST	(India) PSLV-C9	(India) Satish Dhawan Space Centre, Sriharikota, Andhra Pradesh	632 km (393 mi)	649.2 km (403.4 mi)	7,011 km (4,356 mi)	97.4 mins	97.9°	Not Applicable	–	28 April 2008, 5:24:00 IST	–	
51	IMS-1 (Indian Mini-Satellite-1 or, (Third World; Satellite – TWSat)	Earth Sciences	2008-021D	83 kg (183 lb)	220 W	28 April 2008, 9:24:00 IST	(India) PSLV-C9	(India) Satish Dhawan Space Centre, Sriharikota, Andhra Pradesh	Low-cost microsatellite imaging mission. Launched as co-passenger with CARTOSAT-2A									
51	IMS-1 (Indian Mini-Satellite-1 or, (Third World; Satellite – TWSat)	Earth Sciences	32786	–	220 W	28 April 2008, 9:24:00 IST	(India) PSLV-C9	(India) Satish Dhawan Space Centre, Sriharikota, Andhra Pradesh	614 km (382 mi)	629.4 km (391.1 mi)	6,992 km (4,345 mi)	97 mins	97.6°	Not Applicable	–	28 April 2008, 5:24:00 IST	–	
52	(India) Chandrayaan-1 •Orbiter •Impactor	Planetary Sciences	2008-052A	1,380 kg (3,040 lb)	750 W	22 October 2008, 6:22:00 IST	(India) PSLV-C11	(India) Satish Dhawan Space Centre, Sriharikota, Andhra Pradesh	India's first uncrewed lunar probe. It carried 11 scientific instruments built and designed by India, USA, UK, Germany, Norway, Poland and Bulgaria. After a span of 9 months, the lunar craft faced debilitating failure, rendering most on-board systems inoperable. Additionally, faulty orientation of the SAR resulted in failed experiments, which eventually had to be abandoned.									
52	(India) Chandrayaan-1 •Orbiter •Impactor	Planetary Sciences	33405	523 kg (1,153 lb)	750 W	22 October 2008, 6:22:00 IST	(India) PSLV-C11	(India) Satish Dhawan Space Centre, Sriharikota, Andhra Pradesh	~ 100 km (62 mi) (initial)^{§} ~ 200 km (120 mi) (final)^{§}	~ 100 km (62 mi) (initial)^{§} ~ 200 km (120 mi) (final)^{§}	–	–	–	Not Applicable	–	22 October 2008, 2:22:00 IST	–	
53	RISAT-2	Earth Sciences	2009-019A	300 kg (660 lb)	–	20 April 2009, 6:45:00 IST	(India) PSLV-C12	(India) Satish Dhawan Space Centre, Sriharikota, Andhra Pradesh	Radar imaging satellite used to monitor India's borders and as part of anti-infiltration and anti-terrorist operations. Launched as a co-passenger with ANUSAT									
53	RISAT-2	Earth Sciences	34807	–	–	20 April 2009, 6:45:00 IST	(India) PSLV-C12	(India) Satish Dhawan Space Centre, Sriharikota, Andhra Pradesh	470.6 km (292.4 mi)	478.5 km (297.3 mi)	6,845 km (4,253 mi)	93.9 mins	41.2°	Not Applicable	–	–	–	
54	AnuSat-1	Communications	2009-019B	40 kg (88 lb)	–	20 April 2009, 6:45:00 IST	(India) PSLV-C12	(India) Satish Dhawan Space Centre, Sriharikota, Andhra Pradesh	This was a research micro-satellite designed at Anna University that carries an amateur radio and technology demonstration experiments. It has since been retired									
54	AnuSat-1	Communications	34808	–	–	20 April 2009, 6:45:00 IST	(India) PSLV-C12	(India) Satish Dhawan Space Centre, Sriharikota, Andhra Pradesh	–	–	–	90 mins	–	Not Applicable	–	–	18 April 2012	
55	OceanSat-2	Earth Sciences	2009-051A	960 kg (2,120 lb)	1360 W	23 September 2009, 11:51:00 IST	(India) PSLV-C14	(India) Satish Dhawan Space Centre, Sriharikota, Andhra Pradesh	Gathers data for oceanographic, coastal and atmospheric applications. Continues mission of Oceansat-1									
55	OceanSat-2	Earth Sciences	35931	–	1360 W	23 September 2009, 11:51:00 IST	(India) PSLV-C14	(India) Satish Dhawan Space Centre, Sriharikota, Andhra Pradesh	728.2 km (452.5 mi)	731.9 km (454.8 mi)	7,101 km (4,412 mi)	99.3 mins	98.3°	Not Applicable	–	–	–	

^{†} In case of discrepancy in data between sources, N2YO and NASA NSSDCA is taken as the source of truth.
^{‡} Orbital Longitude is applicable only for Geostationary and Geosynchronous satellites.
^{§} All orbital data related to Chandrayaan-1 is for its lunar orbit only.

== 2010s ==
While India had to face failure in launching relatively heavier satellites early on in the decade, it did end up launching 27 geosynchronous/geostationary satellites (17 with indigenous, and 10 with European launchers). In 2010s, it managed to launch most of its geosynchronous/geostationary satellites successfully on its own. This period also saw India enter the exclusive club of nations capable of launching probes to Mars. ISRO also improved upon its student/university outreach by launching multiple pico-, nano- and mini-satellites from various Indian universities. This period was also marked by multiple bilateral collaborations with foreign universities and research organizations. The same decade saw completion of NAVIC, India's regional navigation system.

Increased subcontracting to private vendors across the nation improved launch frequency by a factor of more than 2. India was able to fix glitches and operationalise its Geosynchronous Satellite Launch Vehicle with an indigenous upper stage and operationalise next generation launch vehicle LVM3 with nearly double payload capacity, enabled the country to launch nearly all of its communication satellites. India launched its delayed Moon mission Chandrayaan-2 in 2019 which however failed to conduct soft landing on lunar surface. India also demonstrated capability to destroy "enemy" satellites in orbit. Increased application of India's space capabilities in strengthening its national security was observed.

Substantial increase in budget over the decade, increased payload capacity with increased reliability, increased launch frequency and many "firsts" in this decade had made Indian space program far more visible to world with significant coverage from international media and its hyphenation with leading spacefaring nations. The last launch of the decade marked with completion of 50 launches of PSLV rocket.

Payload Details						Launch Date	Launch Vehicle	Launch Site	Details									Refs (Official portal)
#	Name	Discipline	COSPAR ID	Launch Mass	On-board Power	Launch Date	Launch Vehicle	Launch Site	Periapsis	Apoapsis	Semi-Major Axis	Period	Inclination	Longitude^{‡}	Eccentricity	Epoch Start	Decay Date	Refs (Official portal)
#	Name	Discipline	SatCat #	Dry Mass	On-board Power	Launch Date	Launch Vehicle	Launch Site	Periapsis	Apoapsis	Semi-Major Axis	Period	Inclination	Longitude^{‡}	Eccentricity	Epoch Start	Decay Date	Refs (Official portal)
56	GSAT-4	Communications	Not Applicable	2,220 kg (4,890 lb)	–	15 April 2010	(India) GSLV-D3	(India) Satish Dhawan Space Centre, Sriharikota, Andhra Pradesh	Communications satellite with technology demonstrator features (electric propulsion, Li-ion battery, bus management unit). Failed to reach orbit due to GSLV-D3 failure									
56	GSAT-4	Communications	Not Applicable	–	–	15 April 2010	(India) GSLV-D3	(India) Satish Dhawan Space Centre, Sriharikota, Andhra Pradesh	Not Applicable	Not Applicable	Not Applicable	Not Applicable	Not Applicable	Not Applicable	Not Applicable	Not Applicable	Not Applicable	
57	CartoSat-2B	Earth Sciences	2010-035A	694 kg (1,530 lb)	930 W	12 July 2010, 9:22:00 IST	(India) PSLV-C15	(India) Satish Dhawan Space Centre, Sriharikota, Andhra Pradesh	Earth observation/remote sensing satellite (Identical to CartoSat-2A)									
57	CartoSat-2B	Earth Sciences	36795	–	930 W	12 July 2010, 9:22:00 IST	(India) PSLV-C15	(India) Satish Dhawan Space Centre, Sriharikota, Andhra Pradesh	629.9 km (391.4 mi)	651.4 km (404.8 mi)	7,011 km (4,356 mi)	97.4 mins	97.9°	Not Applicable	–	–	–	
58	StudSat (STUDent SATellite)	Earth Sciences	2010-035B	< 1 kg (2.2 lb)	–	12 July 2010, 9:22:00 IST	(India) PSLV-C15	(India) Satish Dhawan Space Centre, Sriharikota, Andhra Pradesh	India's first pico-satellite (weighing less than 1 kg). It was designed and developed by a team from seven Engineering colleges in Karnataka and Andhra Pradesh									
58	StudSat (STUDent SATellite)	Earth Sciences	36796	–	–	12 July 2010, 9:22:00 IST	(India) PSLV-C15	(India) Satish Dhawan Space Centre, Sriharikota, Andhra Pradesh	605.5 km (376.2 mi)	622.7 km (386.9 mi)	6,985 km (4,340 mi)	96.8 mins	98.0°	Not Applicable	–	–	–	
59	GSAT-5P (INSAT-4D)	Communications	Not Applicable	2,310 kg (5,090 lb)	–	25 December 2010	(India) GSLV-F06	(India) Satish Dhawan Space Centre, Sriharikota, Andhra Pradesh	C-band communication satellite, failed to reach orbit due to GSLV-F06 failure									
59	GSAT-5P (INSAT-4D)	Communications	Not Applicable	–	–	25 December 2010	(India) GSLV-F06	(India) Satish Dhawan Space Centre, Sriharikota, Andhra Pradesh	Not Applicable	Not Applicable	Not Applicable	Not Applicable	Not Applicable	Not Applicable	Not Applicable	Not Applicable	Not Applicable	
60	ResourceSat-2	Earth Sciences; Technology Applications	2011-015A	1,206 kg (2,659 lb)	1250 W	20 April 2011, 10:12:00 IST	(India) PSLV-C16	(India) Satish Dhawan Space Centre, Sriharikota, Andhra Pradesh	This is ISRO's eighteenth remote-sensing satellite, and essentially carries on the work began by ResourceSat-1									
60	ResourceSat-2	Earth Sciences; Technology Applications	37387	–	1250 W	20 April 2011, 10:12:00 IST	(India) PSLV-C16	(India) Satish Dhawan Space Centre, Sriharikota, Andhra Pradesh	825.2 km (512.8 mi)	828.7 km (514.9 mi)	7,197 km (4,472 mi)	101.3 mins	98.7°	Not Applicable	–	–	–	
61	(India) (Russia) YouthSat (IMS-2)	Solar Physics; Space Physics	2011-015B	92 kg (203 lb)	–	20 April 2011, 10:12:00 IST	(India) PSLV-C16	(India) Satish Dhawan Space Centre, Sriharikota, Andhra Pradesh	Indo-Russian stellar and atmospheric mini-satellite with the participation of university students									
61	(India) (Russia) YouthSat (IMS-2)	Solar Physics; Space Physics	37388	–	–	20 April 2011, 10:12:00 IST	(India) PSLV-C16	(India) Satish Dhawan Space Centre, Sriharikota, Andhra Pradesh	808.6 km (502.4 mi)	828.2 km (514.6 mi)	7,189 km (4,467 mi)	101.1 mins	98.6°	Not Applicable	–	–	–	
62	GSAT-8 (GramSat-8, or INSAT-4G)	Communications	2011-022A	3,093 kg (6,819 lb)	6242 W	21 May 2011, 2:08:00 IST	(European Union) Ariane-5 VA-202	(French Guiana) Centre Spatial Guyanais, Kourou	Communications satellite carries 24 Ku-band transponders and 2 channel GAGAN payload operating in L1 and L5 band									
62	GSAT-8 (GramSat-8, or INSAT-4G)	Communications	37605	1,426 kg (3,144 lb)	6242 W	21 May 2011, 2:08:00 IST	(European Union) Ariane-5 VA-202	(French Guiana) Centre Spatial Guyanais, Kourou	35,781 km (22,233 mi)	35,806.3 km (22,249.0 mi)	42,164 km (26,199 mi)	1436.1 mins	0.0°	55° E	–	–	–	
63	GSAT-12 (GramSat-12)	Communications	2011-034A	1,410 kg (3,110 lb)	1430 W	15 July 2011, 16:48:00 IST	(India) PSLV-C17	(India) Satish Dhawan Space Centre, Sriharikota, Andhra Pradesh	The GSAT-12 is configured to carry 12 Extended C-band transponders to augment the capacity in the INSAT system for various communication services like Tele-education, Telemedicine and for Village Resource Centres (VRC). Mission life is expected to be about 8 years									
63	GSAT-12 (GramSat-12)	Communications	37746	559 kg (1,232 lb)	1430 W	15 July 2011, 16:48:00 IST	(India) PSLV-C17	(India) Satish Dhawan Space Centre, Sriharikota, Andhra Pradesh	35,761.6 km (22,221.2 mi)	35,825.9 km (22,261.2 mi)	42,164 km (26,199 mi)	1436.1 mins	0.0°	83° E	–	15 July 2011, 12:48:00 IST	–	
64	(India) (France); Megha-Tropiques	Meteorological	2011-058A	1,000 kg (2,200 lb)	1325 W	12 October 2011, 11:00:00 IST	(India) PSLV-C18	(India) Satish Dhawan Space Centre, Sriharikota, Andhra Pradesh	Megha-Tropiques was developed jointly by ISRO and the French CNES									
64	(India) (France); Megha-Tropiques	Meteorological	37838	–	1325 W	12 October 2011, 11:00:00 IST	(India) PSLV-C18	(India) Satish Dhawan Space Centre, Sriharikota, Andhra Pradesh	860.5 km (534.7 mi)	874.7 km (543.5 mi)	7,238 km (4,497 mi)	102.2 mins	20.0°	Not Applicable	–	12 October 2011, 7:00:00 IST	–	
65	Jugnu	Earth Sciences; Technology Applications	2011-058B	3 kg (6.6 lb)	–	12 October 2011, 11:00:00 IST	(India) PSLV-C18	(India) Satish Dhawan Space Centre, Sriharikota, Andhra Pradesh	Nano-satellite developed by IIT Kanpur									
65	Jugnu	Earth Sciences; Technology Applications	37839	–	–	12 October 2011, 11:00:00 IST	(India) PSLV-C18	(India) Satish Dhawan Space Centre, Sriharikota, Andhra Pradesh	843.9 km (524.4 mi)	871.4 km (541.5 mi)	7,228 km (4,491 mi)	101.9 mins	20.0°	Not Applicable	–	–	–	
66	SRMSat	Earth Sciences; Technology Applications	2011-058D	10.9 kg (24 lb)	–	12 October 2011, 11:00:00 IST	(India) PSLV-C18	(India) Satish Dhawan Space Centre, Sriharikota, Andhra Pradesh	Nano-satellite developed by SRM Institute of Science and Technology									
66	SRMSat	Earth Sciences; Technology Applications	37841	–	–	12 October 2011, 11:00:00 IST	(India) PSLV-C18	(India) Satish Dhawan Space Centre, Sriharikota, Andhra Pradesh	855.8 km (531.8 mi)	873.2 km (542.6 mi)	7,235 km (4,496 mi)	102.1 mins	20.0°	Not Applicable	–	–	–	
67	RISAT-1	Earth Sciences	2012-017A	1,858 kg (4,096 lb)	2200 W	26 April 2012, 5:47:00 IST	(India) PSLV-C19	(India) Satish Dhawan Space Centre, Sriharikota, Andhra Pradesh	RISAT-1 was India's first indigenous all-weather Radar Imaging Satellite, whose images facilitated agriculture and disaster management									
67	RISAT-1	Earth Sciences	38248	–	2200 W	26 April 2012, 5:47:00 IST	(India) PSLV-C19	(India) Satish Dhawan Space Centre, Sriharikota, Andhra Pradesh	542.2 km (336.9 mi)	550 km (340 mi)	6,917 km (4,298 mi)	95.4 mins	97.6°	Not Applicable	–	–	–	
68	PS4 With mRESINS Payload	Avionics	2012-047C	50 kg (110 lb)		9 September 2012 04:23	(India) PSLV-C21	(India) Satish Dhawan Space Centre, Sriharikota, Andhra Pradesh										
68	PS4 With mRESINS Payload	Avionics	38757			9 September 2012 04:23	(India) PSLV-C21	(India) Satish Dhawan Space Centre, Sriharikota, Andhra Pradesh	636.4 km (395.4 mi)	642.6 km (399.3 mi)	7,010 km (4,360 mi)	97.4 minutes	98.3 °	Not applicable	-	-	-	
69	GSAT-10	Communications	2012-051B	3,400 kg (7,500 lb)	6474 W	28 September 2012, 2:48:00 IST	(European Union) Ariane-5 VA-209	(French Guiana) Centre Spatial Guyanais, Kourou	GSAT-10, India's advanced communication satellite, is a high power satellite being inducted into the INSAT system									
69	GSAT-10	Communications	38779	1,498 kg (3,303 lb)	6474 W	28 September 2012, 2:48:00 IST	(European Union) Ariane-5 VA-209	(French Guiana) Centre Spatial Guyanais, Kourou	35,783.3 km (22,234.7 mi)	35,805.4 km (22,248.4 mi)	42,165 km (26,200 mi)	1436.1 mins	0.1°	83° E	–	–	–	
70	(India) (France) SARAL	Earth Sciences	2013-009A	407 kg (897 lb)	906 W	25 February 2013, 18:01:00 IST	(India) PSLV-C20	(India) Satish Dhawan Space Centre, Sriharikota, Andhra Pradesh	The Satellite with ARGOS and ALTIKA (SARAL) is a joint Indo-French satellite mission for oceanographic studies									
70	(India) (France) SARAL	Earth Sciences	39086	–	906 W	25 February 2013, 18:01:00 IST	(India) PSLV-C20	(India) Satish Dhawan Space Centre, Sriharikota, Andhra Pradesh	791.8 km (492.0 mi)	792.6 km (492.5 mi)	7,163 km (4,451 mi)	100.6 mins	98.5°	Not Applicable	–	–	–	
71	IRNSS-1A	Navigation/Global Positioning	2013-034A	1,425 kg (3,142 lb)	1660 W	1 July 2013, 23:41:00 IST	(India) PSLV-C22	(India) Satish Dhawan Space Centre, Sriharikota, Andhra Pradesh	IRNSS-1A is the first of seven satellite in the IRNSS navigational system									
71	IRNSS-1A	Navigation/Global Positioning	39199	614 kg (1,354 lb)	1660 W	1 July 2013, 23:41:00 IST	(India) PSLV-C22	(India) Satish Dhawan Space Centre, Sriharikota, Andhra Pradesh	35,720.2 km (22,195.5 mi)	35,864.3 km (22,285.0 mi)	42,163 km (26,199 mi)	1436.0 mins	28.8°	55.0° E	–	–	–	
72	INSAT-3D	Earth Sciences	2013-038B	2,060 kg (4,540 lb)	1164 W	26 July 2013, 1:23:00 IST	(European Union) Ariane-5 ECA VA-214	(French Guiana) Centre Spatial Guyanais, Kourou	INSAT-3D is the meteorological Satellite with advanced weather monitoring payloads (6-channel multi-spectral imager, 19-channel sounder, data relay transponder and search-and-rescue transponder)									
72	INSAT-3D	Earth Sciences	39216	–	1164 W	26 July 2013, 1:23:00 IST	(European Union) Ariane-5 ECA VA-214	(French Guiana) Centre Spatial Guyanais, Kourou	35,794 km (22,241 mi)	35,795.3 km (22,242.2 mi)	42,165 km (26,200 mi)	1436.1 mins	0.0°	82.0° E	–	–	–	
73	GSAT-7 (INSAT-4F)	Communications	2013-044B	2,650 kg (5,840 lb)	3000 W	30 August 2013, 2:00:00 IST	(European Union) Ariane-5 ECA VA-215	(French Guiana) Centre Spatial Guyanais, Kourou	GSAT-7 is the advanced multi-band communication satellite dedicated for military use. It is currently being exclusively by the navy									
73	GSAT-7 (INSAT-4F)	Communications	39234	–	3000 W	30 August 2013, 2:00:00 IST	(European Union) Ariane-5 ECA VA-215	(French Guiana) Centre Spatial Guyanais, Kourou	35,789.8 km (22,238.8 mi)	35,798.1 km (22,243.9 mi)	42,164 km (26,199 mi)	1436.1 mins	0.0°	74.0° E	–	–	–	
74	Mars Orbiter Mission (MOM) (Mangalyaan-1)	Planetary Science	2013-060A	1,340 kg (2,950 lb)	840 W	5 November 2013, 14:38:00 IST	(India) PSLV-C25	(India) Satish Dhawan Space Centre, Sriharikota, Andhra Pradesh	The Mars Orbiter Mission (MOM), informally called Mangalyaan is India's first Mars orbiter									
74	Mars Orbiter Mission (MOM) (Mangalyaan-1)	Planetary Science	39370	488 kg (1,076 lb)	840 W	5 November 2013, 14:38:00 IST	(India) PSLV-C25	(India) Satish Dhawan Space Centre, Sriharikota, Andhra Pradesh	~ 366 km (227 mi)^{§}	~ 80,000 km (50,000 mi)^{§}	–	4602 mins^{§}	150°^{§}	Not Applicable	–	–	–	
75	GSAT-14	Communications	2014-001A	1,982 kg (4,370 lb)	2600 W	5 January 2014, 16:18:00 IST	(India) GSLV Mk.II-D5	(India) Satish Dhawan Space Centre, Sriharikota, Andhra Pradesh	GSAT-14 is the twenty third geostationary communication satellite of India. It is intended to replace GSAT-3, and to augment the In-orbit capacity of Extended C and Ku-band transponders									
75	GSAT-14	Communications	39498	–	2600 W	5 January 2014, 16:18:00 IST	(India) GSLV Mk.II-D5	(India) Satish Dhawan Space Centre, Sriharikota, Andhra Pradesh	35,774.5 km (22,229.2 mi)	35,813.6 km (22,253.5 mi)	42,165 km (26,200 mi)	1436.1 mins	0.0°	74.0° E	–	–	–	
76	IRNSS-1B	Navigation/Global Positioning	2014-017A	1,432 kg (3,157 lb)	1660 W	4 April 2014, 17:14:00 IST	(India) PSLV-C24	(India) Satish Dhawan Space Centre, Sriharikota, Andhra Pradesh	IRNSS-1B is the second of seven satellite in the IRNSS system									
76	IRNSS-1B	Navigation/Global Positioning	39635	–	1660 W	4 April 2014, 17:14:00 IST	(India) PSLV-C24	(India) Satish Dhawan Space Centre, Sriharikota, Andhra Pradesh	35,700.5 km (22,183.3 mi)	35,883.1 km (22,296.7 mi)	42,162 km (26,198 mi)	1436.0 mins	29.1°	55.0° E	–	–	–	
77	IRNSS-1C	Navigation/Global Positioning	2014-061A	1,425.4 kg (3,142 lb)	1660 W	16 October 2014	(India) PSLV-C26	(India) Satish Dhawan Space Centre, Sriharikota, Andhra Pradesh	IRNSS-1C is the third satellite in the Indian Regional Navigation Satellite System (IRNSS)									
77	IRNSS-1C	Navigation/Global Positioning	40269	–	1660 W	16 October 2014	(India) PSLV-C26	(India) Satish Dhawan Space Centre, Sriharikota, Andhra Pradesh	35,715.5 km (22,192.6 mi)	35,872.6 km (22,290.2 mi)	42,165 km (26,200 mi)	1436.1 mins	3°	83° E	–	–	–	
78	GSAT-16	Communications	2014-078A	3,181.6 kg (7,014 lb)	6000 W	7 December 2014, 2:10:00 IST	(European Union) Ariane-5	(French Guiana) Centre Spatial Guyanais, Kourou	GSAT-16 is the twenty fourth communication satellite of India configured to carry a total of 48 transponders (12 K_{u}, 24 C and 12 C_{ue}, each with a bandwidth of 36 MHz), which was the highest number of transponders in a single satellite at that time									
78	GSAT-16	Communications	40332	–	6000 W	7 December 2014, 2:10:00 IST	(European Union) Ariane-5	(French Guiana) Centre Spatial Guyanais, Kourou	35,762.5 km (22,221.8 mi)	35,824.7 km (22,260.4 mi)	42,164 km (26,199 mi)	1436.1 mins	0.1°	55.0° E	–	–	–	
79	Crew Module Atmospheric Re-entry Experiment	• Re-entry Experiment		3775 kg		18 December 2014, 04:00 UTC	(India) LVM3-X	(India) Satish Dhawan Space Centre, Sriharikota, Andhra Pradesh										
80	IRNSS-1D	Navigation/Global Positioning	2015-018A	1,425 kg (3,142 lb)	1660 W	28 March 2015, 17:19:00 IST	(India) PSLV-C27	(India) Satish Dhawan Space Centre, Sriharikota, Andhra Pradesh	IRNSS-1D is the fourth satellite in the Indian Regional Navigation Satellite System (IRNSS)									
80	IRNSS-1D	Navigation/Global Positioning	40547	603 kg (1,329 lb)	1660 W	28 March 2015, 17:19:00 IST	(India) PSLV-C27	(India) Satish Dhawan Space Centre, Sriharikota, Andhra Pradesh	35,704.7 km (22,185.9 mi)	35,885.0 km (22,297.9 mi)	42,165 km (26,200 mi)	1436.2 mins	29.1°	112° E	–	–	–	
81	GSAT-6 (INSAT-4E)	Communications	2015-041A	2,117 kg (4,667 lb)	3100 W	27 August 2015, 16:52:00 IST	(India) GSLV Mk.II-D6	(India) Satish Dhawan Space Centre, Sriharikota, Andhra Pradesh	GSAT-6 is a communication satellite. GSAT- 6 features an unfurlable antenna, largest on board any satellite. Launch of GSLV-D6 also marks the success of indigenously developed upper stage cryogenic engine									
81	GSAT-6 (INSAT-4E)	Communications	40880	985 kg (2,172 lb)	3100 W	27 August 2015, 16:52:00 IST	(India) GSLV Mk.II-D6	(India) Satish Dhawan Space Centre, Sriharikota, Andhra Pradesh	35,769.6 km (22,226.2 mi)	35,818.4 km (22,256.5 mi)	42,164 km (26,199 mi)	1436.1 mins	0.0°	83° E	–	–	–	
82	Astrosat	Space Sciences	2015-052A	1,513 kg (3,336 lb)	–	28 September 2015	(India) PSLV-C30	(India) Satish Dhawan Space Centre, Sriharikota, Andhra Pradesh	ASTROSAT is India's first dedicated multi wavelength space observatory									
82	Astrosat	Space Sciences	40930	–	–	28 September 2015	(India) PSLV-C30	(India) Satish Dhawan Space Centre, Sriharikota, Andhra Pradesh	642.5 km (399.2 mi)	655 km (407 mi)	7,019 km (4,361 mi)	97.6 mins	6.0°	Not Applicable	–	–	–	
83	GSAT-15	Communications	2015-065A	3,164 kg (6,975 lb)	6200 W	11 November 2015, 3:04:00 IST	(European Union) Ariane 5 VA-227	(French Guiana) Centre Spatial Guyanais, Kourou	Communications satellite, carries communication transponders in Ku-band and a GPS Aided GEO Augmented Navigation (GAGAN) payload operating in L1 and L5 bands. Weight 3164 kg									
83	GSAT-15	Communications	41028	1,440 kg (3,170 lb)	6200 W	11 November 2015, 3:04:00 IST	(European Union) Ariane 5 VA-227	(French Guiana) Centre Spatial Guyanais, Kourou	35,785.66 km (22,236.18 mi)	35,802.6 km (22,246.7 mi)	42,165 km (26,200 mi)	1436.1 mins	0.1°	93.5° E	–	–	–	
84	IRNSS-1E	Navigation/Global Positioning	2016-003A	1,425 kg (3,142 lb)	1660 W	20 January 2016, 9:31:00 IST	(India) PSLV-C31	(India) Satish Dhawan Space Centre, Sriharikota, Andhra Pradesh	IRNSS-1E is the fifth satellite in the Indian Regional Navigation Satellite System (IRNSS)									
84	IRNSS-1E	Navigation/Global Positioning	41241	598 kg (1,318 lb)	1660 W	20 January 2016, 9:31:00 IST	(India) PSLV-C31	(India) Satish Dhawan Space Centre, Sriharikota, Andhra Pradesh	35,709.6 km (22,188.9 mi)	35,875.2 km (22,291.8 mi)	42,163 km (26,199 mi)	1436.0 mins	28.8°	111.75° E	–	–	–	
85	IRNSS-1F	Navigation/Global Positioning	2016-015A	1,425 kg (3,142 lb)	1660 W	10 March 2016, 16:01:00 IST	(India) PSLV-C32	(India) Satish Dhawan Space Centre, Sriharikota, Andhra Pradesh	IRNSS-1F is the sixth satellite in the Indian Regional Navigation Satellite System (IRNSS)									
85	IRNSS-1F	Navigation/Global Positioning	41384	598 kg (1,318 lb)	1660 W	10 March 2016, 16:01:00 IST	(India) PSLV-C32	(India) Satish Dhawan Space Centre, Sriharikota, Andhra Pradesh	35,700.8 km (22,183.4 mi)	35,889.2 km (22,300.5 mi)	42,166 km (26,201 mi)	1436.2 mins	4.1°	32.5° E	–	–	–	
86	IRNSS-1G	Navigation/Global Positioning	2016-027A	1,425 kg (3,142 lb)	1660 W	28 April 2016, 12:59 IST	(India) PSLV-C33	(India) Satish Dhawan Space Centre, Sriharikota, Andhra Pradesh	IRNSS-1G is the seventh and final satellite in the Indian Regional Navigation Satellite System (IRNSS)									
86	IRNSS-1G	Navigation/Global Positioning	41469	598 kg (1,318 lb)	1660 W	28 April 2016, 12:59 IST	(India) PSLV-C33	(India) Satish Dhawan Space Centre, Sriharikota, Andhra Pradesh	35,778.6 km (22,231.8 mi)	35,808.7 km (22,250.5 mi)	42,164 km (26,199 mi)	1436.1 mins	4.2°	129° E	–	–	–	
87	Cartosat-2C	Earth Sciences	2016-040A	737.5 kg (1,626 lb)	986 W	22 June 2016, 9:26:00 IST	(India) PSLV-C34	(India) Satish Dhawan Space Centre, Sriharikota, Andhra Pradesh	Earth observation/remote sensing satellite. Identical to CARTOSAT-2,2A and 2B									
87	Cartosat-2C	Earth Sciences	41599	–	986 W	22 June 2016, 9:26:00 IST	(India) PSLV-C34	(India) Satish Dhawan Space Centre, Sriharikota, Andhra Pradesh	504.7 km (313.6 mi)	526.1 km (326.9 mi)	6,886 km (4,279 mi)	94.8 mins	97.5°	Not Applicable	–	–	–	
88	SathyabamaSat	Technology Applications	2016-040B	1.5 kg (3.3 lb)	–	22 June 2016, 9:26:00 IST	(India) PSLV-C34	(India) Satish Dhawan Space Centre, Sriharikota, Andhra Pradesh	A micro-satellite designed and built by the students of Sathyabama University, Chennai, India. This satellite collect data on green house gases in the LEO atmosphere									
88	SathyabamaSat	Technology Applications	41600	–	–	22 June 2016, 9:26:00 IST	(India) PSLV-C34	(India) Satish Dhawan Space Centre, Sriharikota, Andhra Pradesh	499.2 km (310.2 mi)	521.8 km (324.2 mi)	6,881 km (4,276 mi)	94.7 mins	97.5°	Not Applicable	–	–	–	
89	Swayam-1	Communications; Technology Applications	2016-040J	1 kg (2.2 lb)	–	22 June 2016, 9:26:00 IST	(India) PSLV-C34	(India) Satish Dhawan Space Centre, Sriharikota, Andhra Pradesh	A 1-U pico-satellite designed and built by the students of College of Engineering, Pune. This satellite provides point-to-point communications for the HAM community. A second version of the satellite is now being planned									
89	Swayam-1	Communications; Technology Applications	41607	–	–	22 June 2016, 9:26:00 IST	(India) PSLV-C34	(India) Satish Dhawan Space Centre, Sriharikota, Andhra Pradesh	499.7 km (310.5 mi)	521.5 km (324.0 mi)	6,881 km (4,276 mi)	94.7 mins	97.5°	Not Applicable	–	–	–	
90	INSAT-3DR	Earth Sciences	2016-054A	2,211 kg (4,874 lb)	1700 W	8 September 2016, 16:40:00 IST	(India) GSLV-F05	(India) Satish Dhawan Space Centre, Sriharikota, Andhra Pradesh	An advanced meteorological satellite of India configured with an imaging System and an Atmospheric Sounder									
90	INSAT-3DR	Earth Sciences	41752	956 kg (2,108 lb)	1700 W	8 September 2016, 16:40:00 IST	(India) GSLV-F05	(India) Satish Dhawan Space Centre, Sriharikota, Andhra Pradesh	35,767.2 km (22,224.7 mi)	35,820.6 km (22,257.9 mi)	42,164 km (26,199 mi)	1436.1 mins	0.0°	74.0° E	–	–	–	
91	Pratham	Technology Applications	2016-059A	10 kg (22 lb)	–	26 September 2016, 9:12:00 IST	(India) PSLV-C35	(India) Satish Dhawan Space Centre, Sriharikota, Andhra Pradesh	A mini-satellite built by students and researchers at IIT, Mumbai to study electrical characteristics of the earth's atmosphere									
91	Pratham	Technology Applications	41783	–	–	26 September 2016, 9:12:00 IST	(India) PSLV-C35	(India) Satish Dhawan Space Centre, Sriharikota, Andhra Pradesh	666.8 km (414.3 mi)	715.6 km (444.7 mi)	7,062 km (4,388 mi)	98.4 mins	98.2°	Not Applicable	–	–	–	
92	PISat	Technology Applications	2016-059B	5.25 kg (11.6 lb)	–	26 September 2016, 9:12:00 IST	(India) PSLV-C35	(India) Satish Dhawan Space Centre, Sriharikota, Andhra Pradesh	A micro-satellite designed and built by the students of PES Institute of Technology, Bengaluru at their Crucible of Research and Innovation Laboratory (CRIL) to develop remote sensing applications									
92	PISat	Technology Applications	41784	–	–	26 September 2016, 9:12:00 IST	(India) PSLV-C35	(India) Satish Dhawan Space Centre, Sriharikota, Andhra Pradesh	666.6 km (414.2 mi)	713.2 km (443.2 mi)	7,060 km (4,390 mi)	98.4 mins	98.2°	Not Applicable	–	–	–	
93	ScatSat-1	Earth Sciences	2016-059H	377 kg (831 lb)	–	26 September 2016, 9:12:00 IST	(India) PSLV-C35	(India) Satish Dhawan Space Centre, Sriharikota, Andhra Pradesh	Miniature satellite to provide weather forecasting, cyclone prediction, and tracking services to India									
93	ScatSat-1	Earth Sciences	41790	110 kg (240 lb)	–	26 September 2016, 9:12:00 IST	(India) PSLV-C35	(India) Satish Dhawan Space Centre, Sriharikota, Andhra Pradesh	723.6 km (449.6 mi)	741.2 km (460.6 mi)	7,103 km (4,414 mi)	99.3 mins	98.1°	–	–	–	–	
94	GSAT-18	Communications	2016-060A	3,425 kg (7,551 lb)	6474 W	6 October 2016, 2:00:00 IST	(European Union) Ariane-5 ECA	(French Guiana) Centre Spatial Guyanais, Kourou	At 3.4 tons, this was the heaviest satellite owned/being operated by India at the time of its launch									
94	GSAT-18	Communications	41793	1,480 kg (3,260 lb)	6474 W	6 October 2016, 2:00:00 IST	(European Union) Ariane-5 ECA	(French Guiana) Centre Spatial Guyanais, Kourou	35,760.2 km (22,220.4 mi)	35,827.7 km (22,262.3 mi)	42,164 km (26,199 mi)	1436.1 mins	0.1°	74.0° E	–	–	–	
95	ResourceSat-2A	Earth Sciences	2016-074A	1,235 kg (2,723 lb)	–	7 December 2016, 10:24:00 IST	(India) PSLV-C36	(India) Satish Dhawan Space Centre, Sriharikota, Andhra Pradesh	Its mission is identical to its predecessors (Resourcesat-1 and Resourcesat-2)									
95	ResourceSat-2A	Earth Sciences	41877	–	–	7 December 2016, 10:24:00 IST	(India) PSLV-C36	(India) Satish Dhawan Space Centre, Sriharikota, Andhra Pradesh	826.3 km (513.4 mi)	827.6 km (514.2 mi)	7,197 km (4,472 mi)	101.3 mins	98.7°	Not Applicable	–	–	–	
96	CartoSat-2D	Earth Sciences	2017-008A	714 kg (1,574 lb)	–	15 February 2017, 9:28:00 IST	(India) PSLV-C37	(India) Satish Dhawan Space Centre, Sriharikota, Andhra Pradesh	ISRO holds the world record for launching the highest number of satellites by a single launch vehicle (104 satellites, including the CartoSat-2D and 2 indigenously designed nano-satellites, INS-1A and INS-1B)									
96	CartoSat-2D	Earth Sciences	41948	–	–	15 February 2017, 9:28:00 IST	(India) PSLV-C37	(India) Satish Dhawan Space Centre, Sriharikota, Andhra Pradesh	510.9 km (317.5 mi)	519.9 km (323.1 mi)	6,886 km (4,279 mi)	94.8 mins	97.5°	Not Applicable	–	–	–	
97	INS-1A (ISRO Nano-Satellite 1A)	Technology Applications	2017-008B	8.4 kg (19 lb)	–	15 February 2017, 9:28:00 IST	(India) PSLV-C37	(India) Satish Dhawan Space Centre, Sriharikota, Andhra Pradesh	This is one of 2 nano-satellites designed and manufactured by ISRO, are part of the constellation of 104 satellites launched in a single go									
97	INS-1A (ISRO Nano-Satellite 1A)	Technology Applications	41949	–	–	15 February 2017, 9:28:00 IST	(India) PSLV-C37	(India) Satish Dhawan Space Centre, Sriharikota, Andhra Pradesh	500.8 km (311.2 mi)	515.4 km (320.3 mi)	6,879 km (4,274 mi)	94.6 mins	97.5°	Not Applicable	–	–	–	
98	INS-1B (ISRO Nano-Satellite 1B)	Technology Applications	2017-008G	9.7 kg (21 lb)	–	15 February 2017, 9:28:00 IST	(India) PSLV-C37	(India) Satish Dhawan Space Centre, Sriharikota, Andhra Pradesh	This is one of 2 nano-satellites designed and manufactured by ISRO, are part of the constellation of 104 satellites launched in a single go									
98	INS-1B (ISRO Nano-Satellite 1B)	Technology Applications	41954	–	–	15 February 2017, 9:28:00 IST	(India) PSLV-C37	(India) Satish Dhawan Space Centre, Sriharikota, Andhra Pradesh	500.7 km (311.1 mi)	514.8 km (319.9 mi)	6,878 km (4,274 mi)	94.6 mins	97.5°	Not Applicable	–	–	–	
99	South Asia Satellite (GSAT-9)	Communications	2017-024A	2,230 kg (4,920 lb)	3500 W	5 May 2017, 16:57:00 IST	(India) GSLV Mk.II	(India) Satish Dhawan Space Centre, Sriharikota, Andhra Pradesh	This satellite is being offered by India as a diplomatic initiative to its neighboring countries (SAARC region) for communication, remote sensing, resource mapping and disaster management applications									
99	South Asia Satellite (GSAT-9)	Communications	42695	976 kg (2,152 lb)	3500 W	5 May 2017, 16:57:00 IST	(India) GSLV Mk.II	(India) Satish Dhawan Space Centre, Sriharikota, Andhra Pradesh	35,782.2 km (22,234.0 mi)	35,805.8 km (22,248.7 mi)	42,165 km (26,200 mi)	1436.1 mins	0.1°	97.5° E	–	–	–	
100	GSAT-19 (GSAT-19E)	Communications	2017-031A	3,136 kg (6,914 lb)	4500 W	5 June 2017, 5:28:00 IST	(India) GSLV Mk.III-D1	(India) Satish Dhawan Space Centre, Sriharikota, Andhra Pradesh	Maiden orbital flight of GSLV Mk.III. This is the heaviest rocket (and the heaviest satellite) to be launched by ISRO from Indian soil									
100	GSAT-19 (GSAT-19E)	Communications	42747	1,394 kg (3,073 lb)	4500 W	5 June 2017, 5:28:00 IST	(India) GSLV Mk.III-D1	(India) Satish Dhawan Space Centre, Sriharikota, Andhra Pradesh	35,781.1 km (22,233.3 mi)	35,806.7 km (22,249.3 mi)	42,164 km (26,199 mi)	1436.1 mins	0.1°	82.5° E	–	–	–	
101	NIUSat	Technology Applications	2017-036B	15 kg (33 lb)	40 W	23 June 2017, 9:29:00 IST	(India) PSLV-C38	(India) Satish Dhawan Space Centre, Sriharikota, Andhra Pradesh	This is a satellite designed for remote sensing applications, and built by the students of Noorul Islam University, Kanyakumari									
101	NIUSat	Technology Applications	42766	–	40 W	23 June 2017, 9:29:00 IST	(India) PSLV-C38	(India) Satish Dhawan Space Centre, Sriharikota, Andhra Pradesh	502.5 km (312.2 mi)	526.7 km (327.3 mi)	6,885 km (4,278 mi)	94.8 mins	97.4°	Not Applicable	–	–	–	
102	CartoSat-2E	Earth Sciences	2017-036C	712 kg (1,570 lb)	986 W	23 June 2017, 9:29:00 IST	(India) PSLV-C38	(India) Satish Dhawan Space Centre, Sriharikota, Andhra Pradesh	This is the 7th satellite in the Cartosat series to be built by ISRO									
102	CartoSat-2E	Earth Sciences	42767	–	986 W	23 June 2017, 9:29:00 IST	(India) PSLV-C38	(India) Satish Dhawan Space Centre, Sriharikota, Andhra Pradesh	508.4 km (315.9 mi)	522.2 km (324.5 mi)	6,886 km (4,279 mi)	94.8 mins	97.4°	Not Applicable	–	–	–	
103	GSAT-17	Communications	2017-040B	3,477 kg (7,665 lb)	6200 W	29 June 2017, 2:45:00 IST	(European Union) Ariane-5 ECA	(French Guiana) Centre Spatial Guyanais, Kourou	This is India's 18th communication (and to date, its heaviest) satellite									
103	GSAT-17	Communications	42815	1,480 kg (3,260 lb)	6200 W	29 June 2017, 2:45:00 IST	(European Union) Ariane-5 ECA	(French Guiana) Centre Spatial Guyanais, Kourou	35,771 km (22,227 mi)	35,817 km (22,256 mi)	42,164 km (26,199 mi)	1436.1 mins	0.1°	93.5° E	–	–	–	
104	IRNSS-1H	Navigation/Global Positioning	Not Applicable	1,425 kg (3,142 lb)	–	2 September 2017	(India) PSLV-C39	(India) Satish Dhawan Space Centre, Sriharikota, Andhra Pradesh	First satellite to be co-designed and built with private sector assistance. Failed to reach orbit									
104	IRNSS-1H	Navigation/Global Positioning	Not Applicable	598 kg (1,318 lb)	–	2 September 2017	(India) PSLV-C39	(India) Satish Dhawan Space Centre, Sriharikota, Andhra Pradesh	Not Applicable	Not Applicable	Not Applicable	Not Applicable	Not Applicable	Not Applicable	Not Applicable	Not Applicable	Not Applicable	
105	CartoSat-2F	Earth Sciences	2018-004A	710 kg (1,570 lb)	–	12 January 2018, 9:29:00 IST	(India) PSLV-C40	(India) Satish Dhawan Space Centre, Sriharikota, Andhra Pradesh	ISRO sent 32 satellites, including 3 indigenous ones – CartoSat-2F (the 6th satellite in the Cartosat series to be built by ISRO), MicroSat-TD and INS-1C, on this mission									
105	CartoSat-2F	Earth Sciences	43111	–	–	12 January 2018, 9:29:00 IST	(India) PSLV-C40	(India) Satish Dhawan Space Centre, Sriharikota, Andhra Pradesh	–	–	–	–	–	–	–	–	–	
106	MicroSat-TD	Technology Applications	2018-004T	132 kg (291 lb)	–	12 January 2018, 9:29:00 IST	(India) PSLV-C40	(India) Satish Dhawan Space Centre, Sriharikota, Andhra Pradesh	This is a technology demonstrator, and the forerunner for future satellites in this series. The satellite bus is modular in design and can be fabricated and tested independently of payload									
106	MicroSat-TD	Technology Applications	43128	–	–	12 January 2018, 9:29:00 IST	(India) PSLV-C40	(India) Satish Dhawan Space Centre, Sriharikota, Andhra Pradesh	–	–	–	–	–	–	–	–	–	
107	INS-1C (ISRO Nano-Satellite 1C)	Technology Applications	TBA	11 kg (24 lb)	–	12 January 2018, 9:29:00 IST	(India) PSLV-C40	(India) Satish Dhawan Space Centre, Sriharikota, Andhra Pradesh	INS-1C, the third satellite in the Indian Nanosatellite series, will be carrying a Miniature Multispectral Technology Demonstration (MMX-TD) Payload from Space Applications Centre (SAC). Data sent by this camera can be utilised for topographical mapping, vegetation monitoring, aerosol scattering studies and cloud studies									
107	INS-1C (ISRO Nano-Satellite 1C)	Technology Applications	TBA	–	–	12 January 2018, 9:29:00 IST	(India) PSLV-C40	(India) Satish Dhawan Space Centre, Sriharikota, Andhra Pradesh	–	–	–	–	–	–	–	–	–	
108	GSAT-6A	Communications	2018-027A	2,117 kg (4,667 lb)	3119 W	29 March 2018, 16:56:00 IST	(India) GSLV-F08	(India) Satish Dhawan Space Centre, Sriharikota	Similar to GSAT-6 it is a high power S-band communication satellite configured around I-2K bus. The satellite will also provide a platform for developing technologies such as demonstration of 6 m S-Band Unfurlable Antenna, handheld ground terminals and network management techniques that could be useful in satellite based mobile communication applications. Communication was lost with satellite before final orbit raising maneuver.									
108	GSAT-6A	Communications	–	–	3119 W	29 March 2018, 16:56:00 IST	(India) GSLV-F08	(India) Satish Dhawan Space Centre, Sriharikota	–	–	–	–	–	–	–	–	–	
109	IRNSS-1I	Navigation/Global Positioning	2018-035A	1,425 kilograms (3,142 lb)	1671 W	12 April 2018, 04:04:00	(India) PSLV-C41	(India) Satish Dhawan Space Centre, Sriharikota	Eighth satellite of IRNSS									
109	IRNSS-1I	Navigation/Global Positioning	43286	600 kilograms (1,300 lb)	1671 W	12 April 2018, 04:04:00	(India) PSLV-C41	(India) Satish Dhawan Space Centre, Sriharikota	–	–	–	1450.9 minutes	29°	55.0° E	–	–	–	
110	GSAT-29	High-throughput Communication Satellite	2018-089A	3,423 kg (7,546 lb)		1 November 2018, 11:38	(India) GSLV Mk III D2	(India) Satish Dhawan Space Centre, Sriharikota										
110	GSAT-29	High-throughput Communication Satellite	43698	–		1 November 2018, 11:38	(India) GSLV Mk III D2	(India) Satish Dhawan Space Centre, Sriharikota				13 hours	8.9°			–	–	
111	HySIS	Hyperspectral imaging satellite	2018-096A	380 kg (840 lb)		29 November 2018, 04:27:30 UTC	(India) PSLV-C43	(India) Satish Dhawan Space Centre, Sriharikota	Hyperspectral imaging services for agriculture, forestry, resource mapping, geographical assessment and military applications.									
111	HySIS	Hyperspectral imaging satellite	43719			29 November 2018, 04:27:30 UTC	(India) PSLV-C43	(India) Satish Dhawan Space Centre, Sriharikota	633.3 km (393.5 mi)	648.1 km (402.7 mi)		97 minutes 26 seconds	97.95°	Not applicable		–	–	
112	ExseedSat-1	Communications technology demonstrator	2018-099	1 kg (2.2 lb)	1 W	3 December 2018, 18:34:05 UTC	(United States) SpaceX Falcon 9	(United States) Vandenberg Air Force Base, California	India's first privately funded and built satellite									
112	ExseedSat-1	Communications technology demonstrator			1 W	3 December 2018, 18:34:05 UTC	(United States) SpaceX Falcon 9	(United States) Vandenberg Air Force Base, California						Not applicable		–	–	
113	GSAT-11	Communications satellite	2018-100B	5,854 kg (12,906 lb)	13.6 kW	5 December 2018, 18:16 UTC	(Europe) Ariane 5-VA246	(French Guiana) Centre Spatial Guyanais, Kourou	Heaviest Indian spacecraft in orbit till date.									
113	GSAT-11	Communications satellite	43824		13.6 kW	5 December 2018, 18:16 UTC	(Europe) Ariane 5-VA246	(French Guiana) Centre Spatial Guyanais, Kourou	35,767.8 km (22,225.1 mi)	35,820.1 km (22,257.6 mi)		1,436.1 minutes	0.0°	74.0° E		–	–	
114	GSAT-7A	Military satellite	2018-105A	2,250 kg (4,960 lb)	3.3 kW	19 December 2018, 10:40 UTC	(India) GSLV Mk.II-F11	(India) Satish Dhawan Space Centre, Sriharikota	Services for Indian Air Force and Indian Army.									
114	GSAT-7A	Military satellite	43864		3.3 kW	19 December 2018, 10:40 UTC	(India) GSLV Mk.II-F11	(India) Satish Dhawan Space Centre, Sriharikota	35,786.6 km (22,236.8 mi)	35,799.4 km (22,244.7 mi)		1,436.1 minutes	0.1°	63.0° E		–	–	
115	Microsat-R	Earth imaging for defense applications (details classified)	2019-006A	741.2 kg (1,634 lb)	–	23 January 2019, 19:37 IST	(India) PSLV-C44	(India) Satish Dhawan Space Centre, Sriharikota	Suspected to have been destroyed in 2019 Indian anti-satellite missile test.									–
115	Microsat-R	Earth imaging for defense applications (details classified)	43947		–	23 January 2019, 19:37 IST	(India) PSLV-C44	(India) Satish Dhawan Space Centre, Sriharikota	Not applicable	Not applicable	Not applicable	Not applicable	Not applicable	Not applicable	Not applicable	–	27 March 2019	–
116	PS4 Stage attached with KalamSAT-V2	Student satellite	–	1.26 kg (2.8 lb)	–	23 January 2019, 19:37 IST	(India) PSLV-C44	(India) Satish Dhawan Space Centre, Sriharikota	Used PSLV's 4th stage as orbital platform.									
116	PS4 Stage attached with KalamSAT-V2	Student satellite	–	–	–	23 January 2019, 19:37 IST	(India) PSLV-C44	(India) Satish Dhawan Space Centre, Sriharikota	–	–	–	–		Not applicable	–	–	–	
117	GSAT-31	High-throughput Telecommunication Satellite	2019-007B	2,536 kg (5,591 lb)	4.7 kW	6 February 2019, 02:31 IST	(Europe) Ariane 5-VCA	(French Guiana) Centre Spatial Guyanais, Kourou	Replacement of the aging INSAT-4CR.									
117	GSAT-31	High-throughput Telecommunication Satellite	44035		4.7 kW	6 February 2019, 02:31 IST	(Europe) Ariane 5-VCA	(French Guiana) Centre Spatial Guyanais, Kourou	35,775.7 km (22,230.0 mi)	35,812.3 km (22,252.7 mi)		1,436.1 minutes	0.1°	48.0° E		–	–	
118	EMISAT	Reconnaissance of electromagnetic spectrum (ELINT)	2019-018A	436 kg (961 lb)	800 W	1 April 2019, 09:27 IST	(India) PSLV-C45	(India) Satish Dhawan Space Centre, Sriharikota	Electromagnetic intelligence to track any enemy radars for Indian Armed Forces.									
118	EMISAT	Reconnaissance of electromagnetic spectrum (ELINT)	44078	–	800 W	1 April 2019, 09:27 IST	(India) PSLV-C45	(India) Satish Dhawan Space Centre, Sriharikota	739.3 km (459.4 mi)	767.6 km (477.0 mi)		99.7 minutes	98.38°	Not applicable		–	–	
119	PS4 Stage attached with ExseedSat-2, AMSAT, ARIS and AIS payloads	Amateur radio applications, Ionospheric studies and Maritime Satellite applications respectively.	–			1 April 2019, 09:27 IST	(India) PSLV-C45	(India) Satish Dhawan Space Centre, Sriharikota	Utilization of fourth stage directly as a satellite for experiments.									
119	PS4 Stage attached with ExseedSat-2, AMSAT, ARIS and AIS payloads	Amateur radio applications, Ionospheric studies and Maritime Satellite applications respectively.	–			1 April 2019, 09:27 IST	(India) PSLV-C45	(India) Satish Dhawan Space Centre, Sriharikota				–	–	Not applicable		–	–	
120	RISAT-2B	Disaster management; Radar imaging	2019-028A	615 kg (1,356 lb)		22 May 2019, 05:30:00 IST	(India) PSLV-CA C46	(India) Satish Dhawan Space Centre, Sriharikota	Successor to old RISAT-2.									
120	RISAT-2B	Disaster management; Radar imaging	44233			22 May 2019, 05:30:00 IST	(India) PSLV-CA C46	(India) Satish Dhawan Space Centre, Sriharikota	558.4 km (347.0 mi)	563.5 km (350.1 mi)		95.7 minutes	37.0°	Not applicable	–	–	–	
121	Chandrayaan-2 •Orbiter •Vikram Lander •Pragyan Rover	Lunar Exploration	2019-042A	3850 kg	1 kW	22 July 2019, 09:13:12 UTC	(India) GSLV Mk III M01	(India) Satish Dhawan Space Centre, Sriharikota	India's second lunar exploration mission. Orbital insertion successful, soft landing failed. First operational flight of GSLV Mk III.									
121	Chandrayaan-2 •Orbiter •Vikram Lander •Pragyan Rover	Lunar Exploration	44441	3850 kg	1 kW	22 July 2019, 09:13:12 UTC	(India) GSLV Mk III M01	(India) Satish Dhawan Space Centre, Sriharikota	100 km (62 mi)	100 km (62 mi)	-		90.0°	Not applicable		20 August 2019, 09:02 IST (03:32 UTC)	–	
122	Cartosat-3	Earth observation	2019-081A	1,625 kg (3,583 lb)	2000 W	27 November 2019, 09:28:00 IST	(India) PSLV-XL C47	(India) Satish Dhawan Space Centre, Sriharikota	13 American nano-satellites to be piggybacked along. Cartosat-3 is among optical satellites with highest resolutions in world.									
122	Cartosat-3	Earth observation	44804		2000 W	27 November 2019, 09:28:00 IST	(India) PSLV-XL C47	(India) Satish Dhawan Space Centre, Sriharikota	507.2 km (315.2 mi)	526.6 km (327.2 mi)		94.8 minutes	97.5°	Not applicable	–	–	–	
123	RISAT-2BR1	Radar imaging	2019-089F	628 kg (1,385 lb)		11 December 2019 09:55 UTC	(India) PSLV-QL C48	(India) Satish Dhawan Space Centre, Sriharikota	Has an improved resolution of 0.35 meters.									
123	RISAT-2BR1	Radar imaging	44857			11 December 2019 09:55 UTC	(India) PSLV-QL C48	(India) Satish Dhawan Space Centre, Sriharikota	576 km (358 mi)	576 km (358 mi)			37.0°	Not applicable	–	–	–	

^{†} In case of discrepancy in data between sources, N2YO and NASA NSSDCA is taken as the source of truth.
^{‡} Orbital Longitude is applicable only for Geostationary and Geosynchronous satellites. ^{§} All orbital data related to Mangalyaan-1 is for its Martian orbit only. ^{§} All orbital data related to Chandrayaan-2 is for its lunar orbit only.

== 2020s ==
ISRO aims to increase the launch frequency to 12+ a year, ISRO launched two extraterrestrial exploration missions in 2023 - Aditya L1 and Chandrayaan-3, while it has planned several others including Chandrayaan-4, Lunar Polar Exploration Mission, Shukrayaan-1 and Mars Lander Mission for this decade. A mission to Jupiter after Shukrayaan and a mission to explore beyond Solar System have also been proposed. PSLV is expected to undergo its 100th flight mission in middle of the decade. India's new low cost Small Satellite Launch Vehicle made its maiden flight (SSLV-D1) on August 7, 2022, which unfortunately ended in a failure. SSLV-D2, launched on February 10, 2023, became the first SSLV to launch satellites successfully. The SCE-200 rocket engine, expected to be the powerplant of India's upcoming heavy and super heavy launch systems, is expected to make first flight sometimes in middle of the decade. Conducting an orbital human spaceflight is the highest priority for the agency while the long-term goals of the programme include developing heavy and super heavy cargo rockets, building crewed space stations in earth's & lunar orbits and crewed lunar landings.

Payload Details						Launch Date	Launch Vehicle	Launch Site	Details									Refs (Official portal)
#	Name	Discipline	COSPAR ID	Launch Mass	Power	Launch Date	Launch Vehicle	Launch Site	Periapsis	Apoapsis	Semi-Major Axis	Period	Inclination	Longitude^{‡}	Eccentricity	Epoch Start	Decay Date	Refs (Official portal)
#	Name	Discipline	SatCat #	Dry Mass	Power	Launch Date	Launch Vehicle	Launch Site	Periapsis	Apoapsis	Semi-Major Axis	Period	Inclination	Longitude^{‡}	Eccentricity	Epoch Start	Decay Date	Refs (Official portal)
124	GSAT-30	Communications	2020-005A	3,357 kg (7,401 lb)	6000 W	16 January 2020, 21:05 UTC	(European Union) Ariane 5 ECA VA-251	(French Guiana) Centre Spatial Guyanais, Kourou	Replacement of INSAT-4A									
124	GSAT-30	Communications	45026		6000 W	16 January 2020, 21:05 UTC	(European Union) Ariane 5 ECA VA-251	(French Guiana) Centre Spatial Guyanais, Kourou	35,779.1 km (22,232.1 mi)	35,808.5 km (22,250.4 mi)	42,164 km (26,199 mi)	1436.1 minutes	0.0°	83.0° E				
125	EOS-01 (RISAT-2BR2)	Earth observation	2020-081A	630 kg (1,390 lb)		7 November 2020, 09:42 UTC	(India) PSLV-DL C49	(India) Satish Dhawan Space Centre, Sriharikota, Andhra Pradesh	Space based synthetic aperture imaging radar.									
125	EOS-01 (RISAT-2BR2)	Earth observation	46905			7 November 2020, 09:42 UTC	(India) PSLV-DL C49	(India) Satish Dhawan Space Centre, Sriharikota, Andhra Pradesh	576.1 km (358.0 mi)	582.9 km (362.2 mi)	6,950 km (4,320 mi)	96.1 minutes	36.9°	-				
126	CMS-01 (GSAT-12R)	Communications	2020-099A	1,425 kg (3,142 lb)	1500 W	17 December 2020, 10:11 UTC	(India) PSLV-XL C50	(India) Satish Dhawan Space Centre, Sriharikota, Andhra Pradesh	Extended C-band coverage for mainland India as well as Lakshadweep and A&N Islands.									
126	CMS-01 (GSAT-12R)	Communications	47256		1500 W	17 December 2020, 10:11 UTC	(India) PSLV-XL C50	(India) Satish Dhawan Space Centre, Sriharikota, Andhra Pradesh	35,764.9 km (22,223.3 mi)	35,823.1 km (22,259.4 mi)	42,165 km (26,200 mi)	1436.1 minutes	0.0°	83.0° E				
127	Sindhu Netra	Earth observation				28 February 2021, 03:54 UTC	(India) PSLV-DL C51	(India) Satish Dhawan Space Centre, Sriharikota, Andhra Pradesh	For use by Indian Navy to keep surveillance over Indian Ocean.									
127	Sindhu Netra	Earth observation				28 February 2021, 03:54 UTC	(India) PSLV-DL C51	(India) Satish Dhawan Space Centre, Sriharikota, Andhra Pradesh						-				
128	Satish Dhawan Satellite (SDSat)	Studying space radiations and magnetosphere	2021-015W			28 February 2021, 03:54 UTC	(India) PSLV-DL C51	(India) Satish Dhawan Space Centre, Sriharikota, Andhra Pradesh	Nanosatellite developed by Space Kidz India to study radiations. Carried 25,000 names and a copy of Bhagvad Gita into space.									
128	Satish Dhawan Satellite (SDSat)	Studying space radiations and magnetosphere	47721			28 February 2021, 03:54 UTC	(India) PSLV-DL C51	(India) Satish Dhawan Space Centre, Sriharikota, Andhra Pradesh	339.7 km (211.1 mi)	350.6 km (217.9 mi)	6,716 km (4,173 mi)	91.3 minutes	97.4 °	-				
129	JITSat	Student satellite				28 February 2021, 03:54 UTC	(India) PSLV-DL C51	(India) Satish Dhawan Space Centre, Sriharikota, Andhra Pradesh	Developed by Jeppiaar Institute of Technology as a part of UNITYSat constellation.									
129	JITSat	Student satellite				28 February 2021, 03:54 UTC	(India) PSLV-DL C51	(India) Satish Dhawan Space Centre, Sriharikota, Andhra Pradesh						-				
130	GHRCESat	Student satellite				28 February 2021, 03:54 UTC	(India) PSLV-DL C51	(India) Satish Dhawan Space Centre, Sriharikota, Andhra Pradesh	Developed by G. H. Raisoni College of Engineering Nagpur as a part of UNITYSat constellation.									
130	GHRCESat	Student satellite				28 February 2021, 03:54 UTC	(India) PSLV-DL C51	(India) Satish Dhawan Space Centre, Sriharikota, Andhra Pradesh						-				
131	Sri Shakthi Sat	Student satellite				28 February 2021, 03:54 UTC	(India) PSLV-DL C51	(India) Satish Dhawan Space Centre, Sriharikota, Andhra Pradesh	Developed by Sri Shakthi Institute of Engineering and Technology as a part of UNITYSat constellation.									
131	Sri Shakthi Sat	Student satellite				28 February 2021, 03:54 UTC	(India) PSLV-DL C51	(India) Satish Dhawan Space Centre, Sriharikota, Andhra Pradesh						-				
132	EOS-03 (GISAT-1)	Earth observation	Not Applicable	2,268 kg (5,000 lb)	2280 W	12 August 2021, 12:13 UTC	(India) GSLV Mk II F10	(India) Satish Dhawan Space Centre, Sriharikota, Andhra Pradesh	First satellite of GISAT constellation and first Indian real-time earth observation satellite intended in geostationary orbit. Failed to reach orbit as upper-stage of rocket did not ignite.									
132	EOS-03 (GISAT-1)	Earth observation	Not Applicable	–	2280 W	12 August 2021, 12:13 UTC	(India) GSLV Mk II F10	(India) Satish Dhawan Space Centre, Sriharikota, Andhra Pradesh	Not Applicable	Not Applicable	Not Applicable	Not Applicable	Not Applicable	Not Applicable	Not Applicable	Not Applicable	Not Applicable	
133	EOS-04 (RISAT-1A)	Earth observation	2022-013A	1,710 kg (3,770 lb)	2280 W	14 February 2022, 00:29 UTC	(India) PSLV-XL C52	(India) Satish Dhawan Space Centre, Sriharikota, Andhra Pradesh	ISRO Radar Imaging Satellite designed to provide high quality images under all weather conditions for applications such as Agriculture, Forestry & Plantations, Soil Moisture & Hydrology and Flood mapping.									
133	EOS-04 (RISAT-1A)	Earth observation	51656		2280 W	14 February 2022, 00:29 UTC	(India) PSLV-XL C52	(India) Satish Dhawan Space Centre, Sriharikota, Andhra Pradesh	526.7 km (327.3 mi)	543.5 km (337.7 mi)	6,906 km (4,291 mi)	95.2 minutes	97.6°	-				
134	United States India Taiwan INSPIRESAT-1	Student cubesat	2022-013B	8.7 kg (19 lb)		14 February 2022, 00:29 UTC	(India) PSLV-XL C52	(India) Satish Dhawan Space Centre, Sriharikota, Andhra Pradesh	Developed jointly by Indian Institute of Space Science and Technology (IIST) of India, Laboratory for Atmospheric and Space Physics from the US and National Central University of Taiwan. It is equipped with a compact ionosphere probe to study earth's Ionosphere.									
134	United States India Taiwan INSPIRESAT-1	Student cubesat	51657			14 February 2022, 00:29 UTC	(India) PSLV-XL C52	(India) Satish Dhawan Space Centre, Sriharikota, Andhra Pradesh	526.1 km (326.9 mi)	541.8 km (336.7 mi)	6,904 km (4,290 mi)	95.2 minutes	97.6°	-				
135	India Bhutan INS-2TD	Experimental	2022-013C	17.5 kg (39 lb)		14 February 2022, 00:29 UTC	(India) PSLV-XL C52	(India) Satish Dhawan Space Centre, Sriharikota, Andhra Pradesh	Joint Indo-Bhutanese technology demonstration satellite which is a precursor to INS-2B, first Bhutanese satellite.									
135	India Bhutan INS-2TD	Experimental	51658			14 February 2022, 00:29 UTC	(India) PSLV-XL C52	(India) Satish Dhawan Space Centre, Sriharikota, Andhra Pradesh	525.8 km (326.7 mi)	540.9 km (336.1 mi)	6,904 km (4,290 mi)	95.2 minutes	97.6°	-				
136	Shakuntala (TD-2)	Earth observation	2022-033S	15 kg (33 lb)		1 April 2022, 16:24 (UTC)	(United States) Falcon 9 Block 5 B1061.7	(United States) Cape Canaveral Space Launch Complex 40, Brevard County, Florida	First fully private earth imaging satellite from India by Pixxel.									
136	Shakuntala (TD-2)	Earth observation	52173			1 April 2022, 16:24 (UTC)	(United States) Falcon 9 Block 5 B1061.7	(United States) Cape Canaveral Space Launch Complex 40, Brevard County, Florida	438.4 km (272.4 mi)	452.1 km (280.9 mi)	6,816 km (4,235 mi)	93.3 minutes	97.4 °	-				
137	CMS-02 (GSAT-24)	Communications	2022-067A	4,181.3 kg (9,218 lb)	12000 W	22 June 2022, 21:03 UTC	(European Union) Ariane 5 ECA VA-257	(French Guiana) Centre Spatial Guyanais, Kourou	First demand driven satellite of NSIL. Operated by M/s Tata Play.									
137	CMS-02 (GSAT-24)	Communications	52903	1,774.9 kg (3,913 lb)	12000 W	22 June 2022, 21:03 UTC	(European Union) Ariane 5 ECA VA-257	(French Guiana) Centre Spatial Guyanais, Kourou	35,651.2 km (22,152.6 mi)	35,777.4 km (22,231.0 mi)	42,085 km (26,150 mi)	1432 minutes	0.1°	-				
138	PS4 with POEM-I (PSLV Orbital Experimental Module) Payload	Experimental rocket stage with payloads	2022-072E			30 June 2022, 12:32 (UTC)	(India) PSLV-XL C53	(India) Satish Dhawan Space Centre, Sriharikota, Andhra Pradesh	POEM hosts six payloads. The PSLV Orbital Experimental Module (POEM) also known as PS4 Orbital Platform (PS4-OP) utilizes the spent PSLV fourth stage (PS4) to provide a long duration in-orbit platform for hosting payloads.									
138	PS4 with POEM-I (PSLV Orbital Experimental Module) Payload	Experimental rocket stage with payloads	52939			30 June 2022, 12:32 (UTC)	(India) PSLV-XL C53	(India) Satish Dhawan Space Centre, Sriharikota, Andhra Pradesh	531.6 km (330.3 mi)	578.9 km (359.7 mi)	6,926 km (4,304 mi)	95.6 minutes	10.0 °	-				
139	EOS 02 (Microsat-2A)	Earth observation		145 kg (320 lb)	350 W	7 August 2022, 03:48 UTC	(India) SSLV-D1	(India) Satish Dhawan Space Centre, Sriharikota, Andhra Pradesh	EOS02 was an optical earth observation satellite with a transmission speed of 32 mpps in x band. Due to sensor failure coupled with shortcomings of onboard software, the SSLVs VTM stage as well as the two satellite payloads were injected into an unstable transatmospheric Earth orbit measuring 356×76 km and subsequently destroyed upon reentry.									
139	EOS 02 (Microsat-2A)	Earth observation			350 W	7 August 2022, 03:48 UTC	(India) SSLV-D1	(India) Satish Dhawan Space Centre, Sriharikota, Andhra Pradesh	-	-	-	-	-	-	-	-	-	
140	AzaadiSAT	Student satellite (Earth observation)		8 kg (18 lb)		7 August 2022, 03:48 UTC	(India) SSLV-D1	(India) Satish Dhawan Space Centre, Sriharikota, Andhra Pradesh	8U CubeSat by SpaceKidz India.									
140	AzaadiSAT	Student satellite (Earth observation)				7 August 2022, 03:48 UTC	(India) SSLV-D1	(India) Satish Dhawan Space Centre, Sriharikota, Andhra Pradesh	-	-	-	-	-	-	-	-	-	
141	EOS-06 (Oceansat-3)	Oceanography	2022-158A	1,117 kg (2,463 lb)		26 November 2022, 06:26 UTC	(India) PSLV-XL C54	(India) Satish Dhawan Space Centre, Sriharikota, Andhra Pradesh	India's third generation oceanography satellite.									
141	EOS-06 (Oceansat-3)	Oceanography	54361			26 November 2022, 06:26 UTC	(India) PSLV-XL C54	(India) Satish Dhawan Space Centre, Sriharikota, Andhra Pradesh	741.6 km (460.8 mi)	743.7 km (462.1 mi)	7,113 km (4,420 mi)	99.5 minutes	98.4 °	-				
142	India Bhutan INS-2B (India-BhutanSat)	Earth observation	2022-158E	18.28 kg (40.3 lb)		26 November 2022, 06:26 UTC	(India) PSLV-XL C54	(India) Satish Dhawan Space Centre, Sriharikota, Andhra Pradesh	Multispectral optical imaging satellite jointly developed and operated by India and Bhutan. De-orbited in 2024.									
142	India Bhutan INS-2B (India-BhutanSat)	Earth observation	54365			26 November 2022, 06:26 UTC	(India) PSLV-XL C54	(India) Satish Dhawan Space Centre, Sriharikota, Andhra Pradesh	481 km (299 mi)	492.9 km (306.3 mi)	6,857 km (4,261 mi)	94.2 minutes	97.4 °	-				
143	TD-1 Anand	Experimental	2022-158F	16.51 kg (36.4 lb)		26 November 2022, 06:26 UTC	(India) PSLV-XL C54	(India) Satish Dhawan Space Centre, Sriharikota, Andhra Pradesh	Earth observation satellite by Pixxel.									
143	TD-1 Anand	Experimental	54366			26 November 2022, 06:26 UTC	(India) PSLV-XL C54	(India) Satish Dhawan Space Centre, Sriharikota, Andhra Pradesh	485.6 km (301.7 mi)	496.7 km (308.6 mi)	6,862 km (4,264 mi)	94.3 minutes	97.4 °	-				
144	Thybolt-1	Communications	2022-158D	0.5 kg (1.1 lb)		26 November 2022, 06:26 UTC	(India) PSLV-XL C54	(India) Satish Dhawan Space Centre, Sriharikota, Andhra Pradesh	Communication technology demonstrator by Dhruva Space.									
144	Thybolt-1	Communications	54364			26 November 2022, 06:26 UTC	(India) PSLV-XL C54	(India) Satish Dhawan Space Centre, Sriharikota, Andhra Pradesh	480.3 km (298.4 mi)	492.2 km (305.8 mi)	6,857 km (4,261 mi)	94.2 minutes	97.4 °	-				
145	Thybolt-2	Communications	2022-158D	0.5 kg (1.1 lb)		26 November 2022, 06:26 UTC	(India) PSLV-XL C54	(India) Satish Dhawan Space Centre, Sriharikota, Andhra Pradesh	Communication technology demonstrator by Dhruva Space.									
145	Thybolt-2	Communications	54363			26 November 2022, 06:26 UTC	(India) PSLV-XL C54	(India) Satish Dhawan Space Centre, Sriharikota, Andhra Pradesh	479.9 km (298.2 mi)	491.9 km (305.7 mi)	6,856 km (4,260 mi)	94.2 minutes	97.4 °	-				
146	EOS-07	Earth observation	2023-019A	156.3 kg (345 lb)	357 W	10 February 2023 03:48 (UTC)	(India) SSLV-D2	(India) Satish Dhawan Space Centre, Sriharikota, Andhra Pradesh	Equipped with mm-Wave humidity sounder and spectrum monitoring payload.									
146	EOS-07	Earth observation	55562		357 W	10 February 2023 03:48 (UTC)	(India) SSLV-D2	(India) Satish Dhawan Space Centre, Sriharikota, Andhra Pradesh	435 km (270 mi)	446 km (277 mi)	6,811 km (4,232 mi)	93.2 minutes	37.2 °	-				
147	AzaadiSAT-2	Student satellite (Earth observation)	2013-019B	7.3 kg (16 lb)		10 February 2023 03:48 (UTC)	(India) SSLV-D2	(India) Satish Dhawan Space Centre, Sriharikota, Andhra Pradesh	Students satellite by SpaceKidz India for amateur radio communication.									
147	AzaadiSAT-2	Student satellite (Earth observation)	55563			10 February 2023 03:48 (UTC)	(India) SSLV-D2	(India) Satish Dhawan Space Centre, Sriharikota, Andhra Pradesh	401.5 km (249.5 mi)	423.7 km (263.3 mi)	6,783 km (4,215 mi)	92.7 minutes	37.2 °	-				
148	PS4 with POEM-II (PSLV Orbital Experimental Module)	Experimental rocket stage with payloads	2023-057A			22 April 2023, 08:50 (UTC)	(India) PSLV-CA C55	(India) Satish Dhawan Space Centre, Sriharikota, Andhra Pradesh	Included research payloads from private Indian space industries namely, ARIS 2, PiLoT, ARKA200, DSOL-DU, DSOD-3U & 6U									
148	PS4 with POEM-II (PSLV Orbital Experimental Module)	Experimental rocket stage with payloads	56308			22 April 2023, 08:50 (UTC)	(India) PSLV-CA C55	(India) Satish Dhawan Space Centre, Sriharikota, Andhra Pradesh	593.2 km (368.6 mi)	626.7 km (389.4 mi)	6,980 km (4,340 mi)	96.7 minutes	9.9 °	-				
149	NVS-01 (IRNSS-1J)	Navigation satellite	2023-076A	2,232 kg (4,921 lb)	2400 W	29 May 2023, 10:42 (UTC)	(India) GSLV Mk II F12	(India) Satish Dhawan Space Centre, Sriharikota, Andhra Pradesh	First of second generation navigation satellites in India's NavIC constellation. Includes payloads operating in L1, L5 & S bands and works on indigenous rubidium atomic clock.									
149	NVS-01 (IRNSS-1J)	Navigation satellite	56759		2400 W	29 May 2023, 10:42 (UTC)	(India) GSLV Mk II F12	(India) Satish Dhawan Space Centre, Sriharikota, Andhra Pradesh	35,775.5 km (22,229.9 mi)	35,813.2 km (22,253.3 mi)	42,165 km (26,200 mi)	1436.1 minutes	4.9 °	-				
150	Chandrayaan-3 •Orbiter •Vikram Lander •Pragyan Rover	Lunar Exploration	2023-098C	3900 kg	1 kW	14 July 2023, 09:05:17 (UTC)	(India) LVM3 M04	(India) Satish Dhawan Space Centre, Sriharikota	India's third lunar exploration mission. Orbital insertion successful, soft landing successful, roving successful, hop experiment successful, return to earth successful.									
150	Chandrayaan-3 •Orbiter •Vikram Lander •Pragyan Rover	Lunar Exploration	57320	3900 kg	1 kW	14 July 2023, 09:05:17 (UTC)	(India) LVM3 M04	(India) Satish Dhawan Space Centre, Sriharikota	170 km (110 mi)	36,500 km (22,700 mi)	-		90.0°	Not applicable		5 August 2023	22 August 2024	
151	Aditya-L1	Solar coronal observation spacecraft	2023-132A	1,475 kg (3,252 lb)		2 September 2023, 06:20 (UTC)	(India) PSLV-XL, PSLV-C57	(India) Satish Dhawan Space Centre, Sriharikota, Andhra Pradesh	First solar observation satellite of India. Designed to operate on a Halo orbit around L1 point									
151	Aditya-L1	Solar coronal observation spacecraft	57754			2 September 2023, 06:20 (UTC)	(India) PSLV-XL, PSLV-C57	(India) Satish Dhawan Space Centre, Sriharikota, Andhra Pradesh	Halo orbit around L1 point			177.86 days		-				
152	XPoSat	X-ray astronomy	2024-001A	480 kg (1,060 lb)	1260 W	1 January 2024, 03:40 (UTC)	(India) PSLV-DL C58	(India) Satish Dhawan Space Centre, Sriharikota, Andhra Pradesh	First dedicated X-ray satellite of the nation dedicated to study X-ray polarization.									
152	XPoSat	X-ray astronomy	58694	144 kg (317 lb)	1260 W	1 January 2024, 03:40 (UTC)	(India) PSLV-DL C58	(India) Satish Dhawan Space Centre, Sriharikota, Andhra Pradesh	650 km (400 mi)	650 km (400 mi)	650 km (400 mi)	90.0 minutes	3°	-				
153	INSAT-3DS	Earth Observation		2,275 kg (5,016 lb)	1164 W	17 February 2024, 12:05(UTC)	(India) GSLV-F14	(India) Satish Dhawan Space Centre, Sriharikota, Andhra Pradesh	The satellite is a follow on of INSAT-3DR mission.									
153	INSAT-3DS	Earth Observation		907 kg (2,000 lb)	1164 W	17 February 2024, 12:05(UTC)	(India) GSLV-F14	(India) Satish Dhawan Space Centre, Sriharikota, Andhra Pradesh					19.35°	74°E				
154	EOS-08	Earth Observation		175.5 kg (387 lb)	357 W	17 February 2024, 12:05(UTC)	(India) SSLV-D3	(India) Satish Dhawan Space Centre, Sriharikota, Andhra Pradesh	India's third generation oceanography satellite.									
154	EOS-08	Earth Observation			357 W	17 February 2024, 12:05(UTC)	(India) SSLV-D3	(India) Satish Dhawan Space Centre, Sriharikota, Andhra Pradesh		Q				37.4°E				
155	SR-0 DEMOSAT	Earth Observation		0.2 kg (0.44 lb)		17 February 2024, 12:05(UTC)	(India) SSLV-D3	(India) Satish Dhawan Space Centre, Sriharikota, Andhra Pradesh	Demonstration satellite.									
155	SR-0 DEMOSAT	Earth Observation				17 February 2024, 12:05(UTC)	(India) SSLV-D3	(India) Satish Dhawan Space Centre, Sriharikota, Andhra Pradesh						37.4°E				
156	CMS-03 (GSAT-20)	Communications	2022-214A	4,700 kg (10,400 lb)	12000 W	18 November 2024, 18:30 UTC	(United States) Falcon 9	(United States) Cape Canaveral Space Force Station, Florida	Second demand driven satellite of NSIL. Operated by M/s DishTV.									
156	CMS-03 (GSAT-20)	Communications	52983		12000 W	18 November 2024, 18:30 UTC	(United States) Falcon 9	(United States) Cape Canaveral Space Force Station, Florida					68°	-				
157	SPADEX (SDX01 + SDX02)	Experimental	2024-253A	440 kg (970 lb)	1260 W	30 December 2024, 16:30 (UTC)	(India) PSLV-CA C60	(India) Satish Dhawan Space Centre, Sriharikota, Andhra Pradesh	Attempt first docking of two Indian probes in space.									
157	SPADEX (SDX01 + SDX02)	Experimental	2024-253A	440 kg (970 lb)	1260 W	30 December 2024, 16:30 (UTC)	(India) PSLV-CA C60	(India) Satish Dhawan Space Centre, Sriharikota, Andhra Pradesh						55°	-			
158	NVS-02 (IRNSS-1K)	Navigation satellite	2025-020A	2,232 kg (4,921 lb)	3000 W	29 January 2025, 00:53 (UTC)	(India) GSLV Mk II F15	(India) Satish Dhawan Space Centre, Sriharikota, Andhra Pradesh	Second of second generation navigation satellites in India's NavIC constellation. Includes payloads operating in L1, L5 & S bands and works on indigenous rubidium atomic clock. The launch also marked ISRO's 100th launch from the Satish Dhawan Space Centre in Sriharikota, Andhra Pradesh									
158	NVS-02 (IRNSS-1K)	Navigation satellite			3000 W	29 January 2025, 00:53 (UTC)	(India) GSLV Mk II F15	(India) Satish Dhawan Space Centre, Sriharikota, Andhra Pradesh					-	111.75 °E				
159	EOS-09 (RISAT-1B)	Earth observation; Radar Imaging	Not Applicable	1,696.24 kg (3,739.6 lb)	2400 W	18 May 2025, 00:29 UTC	(India) PSLV-XL C61	(India) Satish Dhawan Space Centre, Sriharikota, Andhra Pradesh	ISRO Radar Imaging Satellite designed to provide continuous and reliable remote sensing data for operational applications across various sectors.									
159	EOS-09 (RISAT-1B)	Earth observation; Radar Imaging	Not Applicable	–	2400 W	18 May 2025, 00:29 UTC	(India) PSLV-XL C61	(India) Satish Dhawan Space Centre, Sriharikota, Andhra Pradesh	Not Applicable	Not Applicable	Not Applicable	Not Applicable	Not Applicable	Not Applicable	Not Applicable	Not Applicable	Not Applicable	
160	India United States NISAR	Radar Imaging	2025-163A	2,393 kg (5,276 lb)	6500 W	30 July 2025, 12:10 (UTC)	(India) GSLV Mk II F16	(India) Satish Dhawan Space Centre, Sriharikota, Andhra Pradesh	NASA-ISRO Synthetic Aperture Radar (NISAR) is a joint Indo-US radar project carrying an L band and an S band radar. It is the world's first radar imaging satellite to use dual frequencies.									
160	India United States NISAR	Radar Imaging	65053		6500 W	30 July 2025, 12:10 (UTC)	(India) GSLV Mk II F16	(India) Satish Dhawan Space Centre, Sriharikota, Andhra Pradesh					98.4°	-				
161	GSAT-7R	Communications	2025-249B	4,410 kg (9,720 lb)		2 November, 2025, 11:56 (UTC)	(India) LVM3 M5	(India) Satish Dhawan Space Centre, Sriharikota, Andhra Pradesh	With a mass of 4.4 tonnes, GSAT-7R is the heaviest geostationary satellite to be launched on LVM3 by ISRO. After Separation of GSAT-7R, LVM3's CE-20 upper stage engine ignited for the second burn for first time. Replacement Satellite for GSAT-7.									
161	GSAT-7R	Communications	66311			2 November, 2025, 11:56 (UTC)	(India) LVM3 M5	(India) Satish Dhawan Space Centre, Sriharikota, Andhra Pradesh						-				
162	EOS-N1	Earth observation; Radar Imaging	Not Applicable			12 January, 2026, 4:48 (UTC)	(India) PSLV-XL C62	(India) Satish Dhawan Space Centre, Sriharikota, Andhra Pradesh	EOS-N1, also called Anvesha, was an Indian hyperspectral earth imaging satellite said to be built by DRDO for strategic defence purposes as well as for civilian monitoring in agriculture, urban mapping, and environmental assessment.									
162	EOS-N1	Earth observation; Radar Imaging	Not Applicable	–		12 January, 2026, 4:48 (UTC)	(India) PSLV-XL C62	(India) Satish Dhawan Space Centre, Sriharikota, Andhra Pradesh	Not Applicable	Not Applicable	Not Applicable	Not Applicable	Not Applicable	Not Applicable	Not Applicable	Not Applicable	Not Applicable	
163	Drishti	Earth observation	2026-100AG	190 kg (420 lb)	–	03 May 2026, 07:00:00 UTC	(United States) Falcon 9 Block 5 Flight 635	(United States) Vandenberg, SLC‑4E	World's first OptoSAR EO Satellite.									
163	Drishti	Earth observation	69010	–	–	03 May 2026, 07:00:00 UTC	(United States) Falcon 9 Block 5 Flight 635	(United States) Vandenberg, SLC‑4E	508.7 km (316.1 mi)	513.5 km (319.1 mi)	6,882 km (4,276 mi)	94.7 mins	97.4°	Not Applicable	–	–	–	
164	Solaras S3	Technology demonstration; Geo-spatial intelligence	2026-164A/B/C	~1 kg	–	18 July 2026, 12:05:00 IST	(India) Vikram-I Test Flight-I	(India) Satish Dhawan Space Centre, Sriharikota, Andhra Pradesh	Third satellite in Indian private company Grahaspace's Solaras series.									
164	Solaras S3	Technology demonstration; Geo-spatial intelligence	100080/100081/100082	–	–	18 July 2026, 12:05:00 IST	(India) Vikram-I Test Flight-I	(India) Satish Dhawan Space Centre, Sriharikota, Andhra Pradesh	446.5 km or 448.4 km or 447.4 km	461.7 km or 457.7 km or 458.2 km	6825 km or 6824 km or 6823 km	93.5 mins	59.9°		–	–	–	
165	SCOPE	Technology demonstration	2026-164A/B/C	3-5 kg	–	18 July 2026, 12:05:00 IST	(India) Vikram-I Test Flight-I	(India) Satish Dhawan Space Centre, Sriharikota, Andhra Pradesh	Launched by Skyroot Aerospace to evaluate performance, vibration handling and precision for Vikram-I rocket for its maiden flight, to demonstrate its own spacecraft capabilities and test the subsystems of company's own 3U Cubesat platform.									
165	SCOPE	Technology demonstration	100080/100081/100082	–	–	18 July 2026, 12:05:00 IST	(India) Vikram-I Test Flight-I	(India) Satish Dhawan Space Centre, Sriharikota, Andhra Pradesh	446.5 km or 448.4 km or 447.4 km	461.7 km or 457.7 km or 458.2 km	6825 km or 6824 km or 6823 km	93.5 mins	59.9°		–	–	–	
166	Embrace	Robotic arm	2026-164A/B/C		–	18 July 2026, 12:05:00 IST	(India) Vikram-I Test Flight-I	(India) Satish Dhawan Space Centre, Sriharikota, Andhra Pradesh	Cosmoserve Space's Mission Embrace; in-orbit robotic arm for Active Debris Removal (ADR), attached to upper stage of the Vikram rocket.									
166	Embrace	Robotic arm	100080/100081/100082	–	–	18 July 2026, 12:05:00 IST	(India) Vikram-I Test Flight-I	(India) Satish Dhawan Space Centre, Sriharikota, Andhra Pradesh	446.5 km or 448.4 km or 447.4 km	461.7 km or 457.7 km or 458.2 km	6825 km or 6824 km or 6823 km	93.5 mins	59.9°		–	–	–	
167	Cosmic Bloom	Material durability experiment	2026-164A/B/C		–	18 July 2026, 12:05:00 IST	(India) Vikram-I Test Flight-I	(India) Satish Dhawan Space Centre, Sriharikota, Andhra Pradesh	Cosmos Diamonds's Lab-grown diamond lotus; intended as material durability test in space.									
167	Cosmic Bloom	Material durability experiment	100080/100081/100082	–	–	18 July 2026, 12:05:00 IST	(India) Vikram-I Test Flight-I	(India) Satish Dhawan Space Centre, Sriharikota, Andhra Pradesh	446.5 km or 448.4 km or 447.4 km	461.7 km or 457.7 km or 458.2 km	6825 km or 6824 km or 6823 km	93.5 mins	59.9°		–	–	–	
168	MICRO ART TRIBUTE	Artwork	2026-164A/B/C		–	18 July 2026, 12:05:00 IST	(India) Vikram-I Test Flight-I	(India) Satish Dhawan Space Centre, Sriharikota, Andhra Pradesh	18K gold miniature rocket containing three microscopic sculptures of Sir C. V. Raman, Dr. Vikram Sarabhai and Dr. A. P. J. Abdul Kalam. Each sculpture measures ~700–800 microns (smaller than a grain of rice) and fits inside the eye of a sewing needle by Ajay Kumar Mattewada.									
168	MICRO ART TRIBUTE	Artwork	100080/100081/100082	–	–	18 July 2026, 12:05:00 IST	(India) Vikram-I Test Flight-I	(India) Satish Dhawan Space Centre, Sriharikota, Andhra Pradesh	446.5 km or 448.4 km or 447.4 km	461.7 km or 457.7 km or 458.2 km	6825 km or 6824 km or 6823 km	93.5 mins	59.9°		–	–	–	
169	EOS-05 (GISAT-1A)	Earth observation	2026-202A	2,367 kg (5,218 lb)		04 September 2026, 02:55:00 IST	(India) GSLV Mk II F17	(India) Satish Dhawan Space Centre, Sriharikota, Andhra Pradesh	Seccond satellite of India's GEO Imaging Satellite sereis. Replacement for EOS-03 (GISAT-1).									
169	EOS-05 (GISAT-1A)	Earth observation	100607			04 September 2026, 02:55:00 IST	(India) GSLV Mk II F17	(India) Satish Dhawan Space Centre, Sriharikota, Andhra Pradesh										

== Forthcoming ==
Following table lists Indian satellites in development and due for launch in near future.

Satellite	Date planned	Launch vehicle	Launch site	Type	Orbit	Reference
TDS-01	FY2026-27	(India) PSLV	SDSC	Technology demonstration	GEO	
EOS-10 (Oceansat-3A)	FY2026-27	(India) PSLV	SDSC	Oceanography	SSO	
SIDRP experimental payload (by OrbitAid)	FY2026-27	(India) SSLV	SDSC	In-space spacecraft refueling	LEO	
NSIL SMiLE (SSLV Module in-LEO Experiments)	FY2026-27	(India) SSLV	SDSC	Technology demonstration	LEO	
NVS-03 (IRNSS-1L)	FY2026-27	(India) GSLV MkII	SDSC	Satellite navigation	GEO	
Gaganyaan-1 (OM-1)	End-2026 to early 2027	(India) HLVM3 G1	SDSC	Testing of crew module	LEO	
GSAT-32 or GSAT-N3	FY2026-27	(India) LVM3	SDSC	Communications satellite	GEO	
NVS-04 (IRNSS-1M)	TBA	(India) GSLV MkII	SDSC	Satellite navigation	GEO	
NVS-05 (IRNSS-1N)	TBA	(India) GSLV MkII	SDSC	Satellite navigation	GEO	
Gaganyaan-2	2027	(India) HLVM3 G2	SDSC	Testing of crew module	LEO	
Gaganyaan-3	2027	(India) HLVM3 G3	SDSC	Testing of crew module	LEO	
GISAT-2	TBA	(India) GSLV MkII	SDSC	Multispectral and hyperspectral Earth imaging satellite	GEO	
GSAT-7C	TBA	(India) GSLV MkII	SDSC	Military communications satellite	GEO	
DRSS-1	TBA	(India) GSLV MKII	SDSC	Data relay and satellite tracking system	GEO	
DRSS-2	TBA	(India) LVM3	SDSC	Data relay and satellite tracking system	GEO	
DISHA × 2	2025	(India) PSLV	SDSC	Aeronomy satellite	LEO	
Venus Orbiter Mission	29 March 2028	(India) GSLV MkII	SDSC	Venus exploration	Cytherion	
Cartosat-3A	TBA	(India) PSLV	SDSC	Earth observation	SSO	
Cartosat-3B	TBA	(India) PSLV	SDSC	Earth observation	SSO	
Chandrayaan-4	NET 2027	(India) 2 × LVM3 SC	SDSC	Lunar exploration	Selenocentric	
Lunar Polar Exploration Mission	NET 2028	(Japan) H3	(Japan) LA-Y, Tanegashima	Lunar exploration	Selenocentric	
Mars Lander Mission	NET 2031	(India) GSLV MkII	SDSC	Mars exploration	Martian	
AstroSat-2	TBD	(India) PSLV	SDSC	Space telescope	LEO	
GSAT-22	TBD	TBD	TBD	Communications satellite	GEO	
GSAT-23	TBD	TBD	TBD	Communications satellite	GEO	
HRSAT-1A, 1B & 1C	TBA	(India) PSLV	SDSC	Earth observation	SSO	

== Launch statistics ==
Following statistics are on the basis of number of satellites launched that were built-in or were to be operated by India. It does not account number of launch vehicles used or special orbital missions like re-entry that aren't taken into account as satellites. It also does not account foreign satellites launched by India.

=== Decade wise ===
The following bar chart lists number of Indian satellites launched decade-wise.

Decade	Country of origin of launch vehicle								Total	
Decade	India		European Union		Soviet Union/ Russia		United States		Total	
Decade	Success	Failure	Success	Failure	Success	Failure	Success	Failure	Success	Failure
1970s	0	1	0	0	2	0	0	0	2	1
1980s	3	2	2	0	2	0	2	0	9	2
1990s	6	1	6	0	2	0	1	0	15	1
2000s	18	1	6	0	0	0	0	0	24	1
2010s	54	3	10	0	0	0	1	0	65	3
2020s	34	5	2	0	0	0	1	0	37	5
Total	115	12	26	0	6	0	5	0	152	12

- India (success)
- India (failure)
- Europe (success)
- Europe (failure)
- USSR/Russia (success)
- USSR/Russia (failure)
- USA (success)
- USA (failure)

=== Country wise ===
The following bar chart lists the number of satellites launched based on the origin of the launch vehicle

Country of origin of launch system	Number of Indian satellites launched		
Country of origin of launch system	Success	Failure	Total
India	115	12	127
European Union	26	0	26
Soviet Union/Russia	6	0	6
United States	5	0	5
Total	152	12	164

- India (success)
- India (failure)
- Europe (success)
- Europe (failure)
- USSR/Russia (success)
- USSR/Russia (failure)
- USA (success)
- USA (failure)

== Other orbital and suborbital spacecraft ==
Spacecraft	Discipline	Date	Launch mass	Launch vehicle	Launch Site	Orbit	Deorbited	Ref
Launched
SRE-1	Re-entry experiment	10 January 2007, 03:54 UTC	550 kg (1,210 lb)	PSLV-G C7	Satish Dhawan Space Centre, Sriharikota	485 km (301 mi) x 639 km (397 mi)	22 January 2007, 04:16 UTC	
Moon Impact Probe (Chandrayaan-1)	Lunar impactor	22 October 2008, 00:52 UTC	34 kg (75 lb)	PSLV-XL C11	Satish Dhawan Space Centre, Sriharikota	100 km (62 mi) x 100 km (62 mi) (Selenocentric)	14 November 2008, 20:06	
Crew Module Atmospheric Re-entry Experiment	Re-entry experiment	18 December 2014, 04:00 UTC	3,775 kg (8,322 lb)	LVM3-X	Satish Dhawan Space Centre, Sriharikota	126 km (78 mi) apogee to 1,600 km (990 mi) range (Sub-orbital)	18 December 2014, 04:15 UTC	
Vikram lander (Chandrayaan-2)	Soft lunar landing	20 August 2019, 03:32 UTC	1,471 kg (3,243 lb)	GSLV Mark III M1	Satish Dhawan Space Centre, Sriharikota	100 km (62 mi) x 100 km (62 mi) (Selenocentric)	6 September 2019, 20:23 UTC	
Pragyan (Chandrayaan-2) (Chandrayaan-2)	Lunar rover	20 August 2019, 03:32 UTC	27 kg (60 lb)	GSLV Mark III M1	Satish Dhawan Space Centre, Sriharikota	100 km (62 mi) x 100 km (62 mi) (Selenocentric)	6 September 2019, 20:23 UTC	
Vikram lander (Chandrayaan-3)	Soft lunar landing	5 August 2023	1,471 kg (3,243 lb)	LVM3 M4	Satish Dhawan Space Centre, Sriharikota	113 km (70 mi) x 157 km (98 mi) (Selenocentric)	23 August 2023, 12:33 (UTC)	
Pragyan (Chandrayaan-3) (Chandrayaan-3)	Lunar rover	5 August 2023	27 kg (60 lb)	LVM3 M4	Satish Dhawan Space Centre, Sriharikota	113 km (70 mi) x 157 km (98 mi) (Selenocentric)	23 August 2023, 12:33 (UTC)	

== ISRO satellites launched by foreign agencies ==
ISRO satellites which have been launched by foreign space agencies (of Europe, USSR / Russia, and United States) are enlisted in the given tables below.

- Ariane
- Interkosmos
- Vostok
- Molniya
- Delta
- Space Shuttle
- Falcon 9

Launch vehicle family	Satellites launched				
Launch vehicle family	Communication	Earth observation	Experimental	Other	Total
Europe
Ariane	20	0	1	0	21
USSR / Russia
Interkosmos	0	2	1	0	3
Vostok	0	2	0	0	2
Molniya	0	1	0	0	1
Soyuz	0	0	0	1	1
USA
Delta	2	0	0	0	2
Space Shuttle	1	0	0	0	1
Falcon 9	1	0	0	0	1
Total	24	5	2	0	31

ISRO satellites that were launched by foreign agencies, are listed in the table below.

No.	Satellite's name	Launch vehicle	Launch agency	Country / region of launch agency	Launch date	Launch mass	Power	Orbit type	Mission life	Other information	Reference(s)
1.	Aryabhata	Kosmos-3M		USSR	19 April 1975	360 kg	46 W	Low Earth orbit			
2.	Bhaskara-1	Kosmos-3M		USSR	7 June 1979	442 kg	47 W	Low Earth orbit	1 year		
3.	Apple	Ariane 1 L-03	Arianespace	Europe	19 June 1981	670 kg	210 W	Geosynchronous	2 years		
4.	Bhaskara-2	Kosmos-3M		USSR	20 November 1981	444 kg	47 W	Low Earth orbit	1 year		
5.	INSAT-1A	Delta 3910	McDonnell-Douglas	USA	10 April 1982	1,152 kg with propellants (550 kg dry mass)	1000 W	Geosynchronous	7 years		
6.	INSAT-1B	STS-8		USA	30 August 1983	1,152 kg with propellants (550 kg dry mass)	1000 W	Geosynchronous	7 years		
*	Soyuz T-11	Soyuz-U		USSR	3 April 1984			Low Earth orbit		Carrying India's first Astronaut Rakesh Sharma. The Mission was Organised By USSR. It was launched from Baikonur 31/6 on a Soyuz-U Launch vehicle on 3 April 1984 at 13:08:00 UTC.	
7.	IRS-1A	Vostok-2		USSR	17 March 1988	975 kg	620 W	Sun-synchronous	7 years		
8.	INSAT-1C	Ariane 3 V-24/L-23	Arianespace	Europe	22 July 1988	1,190 kg with propellants (550 kg dry mass)	1000 W	Geosynchronous	7 years		
9.	INSAT-1D	Delta 4925	McDonnell-Douglas	USA	12 June 1990	1,190 kg with propellants (550 kg dry mass)	1000 W	Geosynchronous	12 years		
10.	IRS-1B	Vostok-2		USSR	29 August 1991	975 kg	600 W	Sun-synchronous	12 years		
11.	INSAT-2A	Ariane 4 V-51/423	Arianespace	Europe	10 July 1992	1,906 kg with propellants (905 kg dry mass)	1000 W	Geosynchronous	7 years		
12.	INSAT-2B	Ariane 4 V-58/429	Arianespace	Europe	22 July 1993	1,906 kg with propellants (916 kg dry mass)	1000 W	Geosynchronous	7 years		
13.	INSAT-2C	Ariane 4 V-81/453	Arianespace	Europe	6 December 1995	2,106 kg with propellants (946 kg dry mass)	1450 W	Geosynchronous	7 years		
14.	IRS-1C	Molniya-M		Russia	28 December 1995	1250 kg	813 W	Sun-synchronous	7 years		
15.	INSAT-2D	Ariane 4 V-97/468	Arianespace	Europe	3 June 1997	2,079 kg with propellants (995 kg dry mass)	1540 W	Geosynchronous	7 years		
16.	INSAT-2E	Ariane 4 V-117/486	Arianespace	Europe	2 April 1999	2,550 kg with propellants (1,150 kg dry mass)	2150 W	Geosynchronous	12 years		
17.	INSAT-3B	Ariane 5 V-128	Arianespace	Europe	21 March 2000	2,070 kg with propellants (970 kg dry mass)	1712 W	Geosynchronous	10 years		
18.	INSAT-3C	Ariane 4 V-147	Arianespace	Europe	23 January 2002	2,750 kg with propellants (1,220 kg dry mass)	2765 W	Geosynchronous	12 years		
19.	INSAT-3A	Ariane 5 V-160	Arianespace	Europe	9 April 2003	2,950 kg with propellants (1,350 kg dry mass)	3100 W	Geosynchronous	12 years		
20.	INSAT-3E	Ariane 5 V-162	Arianespace	Europe	27 September 2003	2,778 kg with propellants (1,218 kg dry mass)	3100 W	Geosynchronous	12 years		
21.	INSAT-4A	Ariane 5 V169	Arianespace	Europe	22 December 2005	3081 kg with propellants (1386.55 kg dry mass)	5922 W	Geosynchronous	12 years	Communication satellite	
22.	INSAT-4B	Ariane 5 ECA	Arianespace	Europe	12 March 2007	3,025 kg with propellants	5859 W	Geosynchronous	12 years	Communication satellite	
23.	GSAT-8	Ariane-5 VA-202	Arianespace	Europe	21 May 2011	3,093 kg with propellants (1,426 kg dry mass)	6242 W	Geosynchronous	More than 12 years	Communication satellite	
24.	INSAT-3D	Ariane-5 VA-214	Arianespace	Europe	26 July 2013	2,061 kg with propellants (937.8 kg dry mass)	1164 W	Geosynchronous	7 years	Weather satellite	
25.	GSAT-7	Ariane-5 VA-215	Arianespace	Europe	30 August 2013	2,650 kg with propellants (1,211 kg dry mass)	2915 W	Geosynchronous	7 years	Communication satellite	
26.	GSAT-10	Ariane-5 VA-209	Arianespace	Europe	29 September 2010	3,400 kg with propellants (1,498 kg dry mass)	6474 W	Geosynchronous	15 years	Communication satellite	
27.	GSAT-16	Ariane-5 VA-221	Arianespace	Europe	7 December 2014	3,181.6 kg with propellants	6000 W	Geosynchronous	12 years	Communication satellite, carries 48 transponders, the most in any ISRO communication satellite so far.	
28.	GSAT-15	Ariane-5 VA-227	Arianespace	Europe	11 November 2015	3,164 kg with propellants	6000 W	Geosynchronous	12 years	Communication satellite, carries 24 transponders.	
29.	GSAT-18	Ariane-5 VA-231	Arianespace	Europe	6 October 2016	3,404 kg	6474 W	Geosynchronous	15 years	Communication satellite, carries 48 transponders.	
30.	GSAT-17	Ariane-5 VA-238	Arianespace	Europe	28 June 2017	3,477 kg	6474 W	Geosynchronous	15 years	Communication satellite, carries 42 transponders.	
31.	GSAT-11	Ariane-5 VA-246	Arianespace	Europe	5 December 2018	5,854 kg	13.4 kW	Geosynchronous	15 years	Communication satellite	
32.	GSAT-31	Ariane-5 VA-247	Arianespace	Europe	5 February 2019	2,536 kg	4.7 kW	Geosynchronous	15 years	Communication satellite	
33.	GSAT-30	Ariane-5 VA-251	Arianespace	Europe	16 January 2020	3,547 kg	6 kW	Geosynchronous	15 years	Communication satellite	
34.	CMS-02 (GSAT-24)	Ariane-5 VA-257	Arianespace	Europe	22 June 2022	4,181.3 kg	12 kW	Geosynchronous	15 years	Communication satellite	
35.	CMS-03 (GSAT-20)	Falcon 9	SpaceX	USA	18 November 2025	4,700 kg	12 kW	Geosynchronous	15 years	Communication satellite	

== See also ==
- Indian Space Research Organisation (ISRO)
- Indian Remote Sensing Programme (IRSP)
- Indian Regional Navigation Satellite System (IRNSS)
- Indian National Satellite System (INSAT)
- GSAT
- List of foreign satellites launched by India
- List of ISRO missions
- Space industry of India
