= INSAT-2D =

Indian geostationary communications satellite

- Mission type: Multipurpose communication
- Operator: INSAT
- COSPAR ID: 1997-027B
- SATCAT no.: 24820
- Mission duration: 7 Years

Spacecraft properties
- Manufacturer: ISRO
- Launch mass: 2,079 kg (4,583 lb)
- Dry mass: 995 kg (2,194 lb)
- Power: 1650 watts

Start of mission
- Launch date: 4 June 1997
- Rocket: Ariane-4
- Launch site: French Guiana

End of mission
- Deactivated: 4 Oct, 1997

Orbital parameters
- Reference system: Geocentric
- Regime: Geostationary
- Longitude: 93.5 Degree East

INSAT-2D was an Indian communications satellite. Launched on 4 June 1997, and similar to INSAT-2C, INSAT-2D went out of order on October 4, 1997, because of a power inconsistency problem and was later replaced by INSAT-2DT, an in-orbit satellite which was previously known as ARABSAT-1C. The main aim of the satellite was improved communication. In the INSAT-2 (Indian National Satellite System) series, INSAT-2D was the fourth consecutive communication satellite. The satellite was launched using an Ariane 4 rocket from French Guiana.

The satellite was placed into geostationary orbit at an inclination of 93.5 degrees east. INSAT-2D's lift-off mass was 2,079 kg (4,583 lb) with propellants of which 995 kg (2,194 lb) were the dry weight. The satellite was expected to have a nominal lifespan of around 7–9 years. But it became inoperable just four months later on 4 October 1997, due to a power bus anomaly and associated problems, most likely a short circuit. The onboard power of the satellite was estimated to be 1,650 watts.

Insat-2D, imaged at Northolt Branch Observatories, satellite can be seen as a bright spot passing by fast. BepiColombo satellite of JAXA can also be seen as a dot moving slowly across the screen.

Its communication payload consisted of 16C-band transponders (extended C-band, for fixed-satellite service), two high-power C-band transponders (for broadcasting-satellite service, BSS), one S-band transponder (for BSS), one C/S-band mobile communication transponder, and three K_{u}-band transponders.
