= Sri Shakthi Institute of Engineering and Technology =

Sri Shakthi Institute of Engineering and Technology (Autonomous)
- Motto: Powering the Youth, Empowering the Nation
- Established: 2006
- Affiliations: Anna University
- Chairman: S. Thangavelu
- Location: Sri Shakthi Nagar, L & T By - Pass, Chinniyampalayam, Coimbatore, Tamil Nadu, India
- Website: siet.ac.in

Sri Shakthi Institute of Engineering & Technology (SIET) is an autonomous engineering institute located in Coimbatore, Tamil Nadu, India. Established in 2006, it is affiliated to Anna University. As of 2019, four of its programmes are accredited by the National Board of Accreditation (NBA).

== Under Graduate Courses ==
1. B.Tech - Agricultural Engineering
2. B.E - Biomedical Engineering
3. B.Tech - Biotechnology
4. B.E - Civil Engineering
5. B.E - Computer Science and Engineering
6. B.E - Computer Science and Engineering (Cyber Security)
7. B.E - Electrical and Electronics Engineering
8. B.E - Electronics and Communication Engineering
9. B.Tech - Food Technology
10. B.Tech - Information Technology
11. B.E - Mechanical Engineering
12. B.Tech - Artificial Intelligence and Data Science
13. B.Tech - Artificial Intelligence and Machine Learning
14. B.E -VLSI Design

== Post Graduate Courses ==
1. M.E - Computer Science and Engineering
2. M.E - VLSI Design
3. M.E - CAD/CAM
4. M.E - Embedded System Technologies
5. M.E - Structural Engineering

== Research Centers (Ph.D) ==
- Department of Electronics and Communication Engineering
- Department of Computer Science Engineering
- Department of Electrical and Electronics Engineering
- Department of Mechanical Engineering
- Department of Civil Engineering
- Department of Physics
- Department of Chemistry

== Annual Events ==
- International Conference on Computer Communication and Informatics (ICCCI)
- Kalam - Inter-Collegiate Techno cultural fest
- Velaan Thiruvizha
