= INSAT-2C =

Indian telecommunications satellite

- Mission type: Communication
- Operator: INSAT
- COSPAR ID: 1995-067B
- SATCAT no.: 23731
- Mission duration: Planned: 7 years Final: 18 years

Spacecraft properties
- Manufacturer: ISRO
- Launch mass: 2,106 kilograms (4,643 lb)
- Dry mass: 916 kg
- Power: 1000 watts

Start of mission
- Launch date: 6 December 1995, 23:23:00
- Rocket: Ariane-4
- Launch site: Kourou, French Guiana
- Contractor: Arianespace

Orbital parameters
- Reference system: Geocentric
- Regime: Geostationary
- Longitude: 93.5 degree east
- Inclination: 14.2 degrees

INSAT-2C (also known as Indian National Satellite-2) was an Indian geostationary communications spacecraft. It is ISRO's third indigenous communications satellite.

== History ==
It was launched by Ariane 44L from Guiana Space Centre, French Guiana on December 6, 1995. It was working properly for years, but in January 2013, its communication C-band transponder collapsed. It was launched to improve communication facilities in Northeast India and Andaman and Nicobar Islands.

== Information ==
Its mass during launch was 2,106 kg and dry mass was 946 kg. It revolves around Geostationary orbit with altitude of 35,786 and longitude of 93.5 degree east. Its onboard power was 1,320 Watts with mission life of 7 years and its planned orbit life to be very long.

== Capabilities ==
It has capabilities like business communication, mobile satellite service and can make television outreach beyond boundary of India.
