= List of PSLV launches =

Launches made by ISRO's Polar Satellite Launch Vehicle family of rockets

This is a list of launches made by ISRO using Polar Satellite Launch Vehicle (PSLV).

== Notable missions ==
=== PSLV flight D1 ===
This was the first developmental flight of the PSLV-D1. The IRS-1E satellite which was proposed to be launched was derived from the engineering model of IRS-1A incorporating a similar camera and an additional German-built monocular electro-optical stereo scanner. Even though the mission was a failure, the launch team and an expert committee appointed thereafter noted that the mission had validated many technologies and that most sub-systems had performed optimally.

=== PSLV flight C2 ===
In the flight sequence, IRS-P4 was injected first, followed by KITSAT-3 and DLR-Tubsat in that order. The mission was supported by ISRO Telemetry, Tracking and Command Network of ground stations located at Bangalore, Sriharikota, Lucknow, Mauritius, Bearslake, Russia and Biak, Indonesia. During the initial phase of the mission the ground station at Weilheim and Neustrelitz in Germany also provided network support. Upon injection of the satellites, data from the IRS-P4 was received at Hyderabad while KITSAT-3 data was received at the ground station in South Korea and the data from the DLR-Tubsat was received at the university ground station in Berlin.

=== PSLV flight C6 ===
The former President, Dr. Abdul Kalam, witnessed the launch from the Mission Control Centre. It was the first PSLV launch from second pad, using integrate-transfer-and-launch technology. After its integration in the Vehicle Assembly Building, the PSLV-C6 was transported on rails to the Umbilical Tower (UT) located one km away using the Mobile Launch Pedestal where the final operations were carried out.

=== PSLV flight C7 ===
The following hardware changes were made since PSLV-C6:

- first use of DLA (Dual Launch Adapter) to launch 2 primary satellites in time
- reduction of propellant from 2.5 tonne to 2 tonne in the fourth liquid propellant stage
- incorporation of a video imaging system to capture payload and DLA separation events
- altitude based day of launch wind-biased steering programme during Open Loop Guidance
- removal of Secondary Injection Thrust Vector Control (SITVC) system for one of the strapons ignited in the air.

=== PSLV flight C9 ===
The fourth stage first fired Cartosat-2A into orbit at an altitude of 637 km about 885 seconds after lift-off. About 45 seconds later, it propelled IMS-1 into the orbit. Then the six nano satellites belonging to a cluster called Nanosatellite Launch System-4 (NLS-4) were injected into orbit at intervals of 20 seconds each. NLS-5, a single satellite, flew out and finally the tenth satellite Rubin-8 went along with the fourth stage into orbit. Two satellites belonged to India and the remaining were nanosatellites built by universities in different countries. This was the maximum number of satellites placed in orbit, in a single PSLV launch.

=== PSLV flight C21 ===
Launch attended by the former prime minister, Manmohan Singh. mRESINS (mini Redundant Strapdown Inertial Navigation System) bolted to the vehicle's fourth stage, have tested avionics for future PSLV missions. With this launch Indian Space Research Organisation marked its 100 space missions, with 62 satellites, 37 launch vehicles and 1 Space Capsule Recovery Experiment.

=== PSLV flight C22 ===
Earlier launch date for PSLV C22 was fixed as 12 June 2013 but the launch had been postponed because of a technical snag in the 2nd stage.

ISRO then replaced a faulty component in the PSLV C22 rocket and rescheduled the flight of the IRNSS-1A satellite on 1 July 2013. PSLV C22, successfully launched IRNSS-1A, the first satellite in the Indian Regional Navigation Satellite System (IRNSS). At the completion of the countdown, PSLV C22 lifted off from the First Launch Pad at 23:41 (IST) on 1 July 2013 with the ignition of the first stage and four strap-on motors of the launch vehicle.

=== PSLV flight C25 ===
The Mars Orbiter Mission (MOM), informally called Mangalyaan is a Mars orbiter that was successfully injected into Earth orbit on 5 November 2013 at 14:38 IST (09:08 UTC) atop a PSLV-XL launch vehicle from Satish Dhawan Space Centre, Sriharikota (SHAR).

=== PSLV flight C29 ===
PSLV C29 lifted off from the First Launch Pad (FLP) of SDSC SHAR at 18:00 [IST] on 16 December 2015. It successfully deployed six satellites it carried with gross weight of 624 kg. After fourth stage engines were cut off primary payload TeLEOS-1 was injected in orbit at about 18 minutes 12 seconds after lift-off. This was followed by the deployment of other five satellites, namely Kent Ridge-1, VELOX-C1, VELOX-II, Galassia and Athenoxat-1 in quick succession in the subsequent three minutes. 67 minutes into flight fourth stage re-ignition capability was demonstrated successfully by firing its engines for duration of nearly five seconds. This capability would enable multiple satellite deployment in varying orbits on same flight.

=== PSLV flight C34 ===
PSLV-C34 was launched on 22 June 2016 and successfully deployed 20 satellites in Sun-synchronous orbit. A Dual Launch Adapter with new design compared to its previous version was used to integrate all ride-sharing payloads with PS4. After completion of mission a pair of PS4 re-ignition tests were performed to reaffirm multi-orbit deployment capability of PS4. A new inertial navigation system 'Mk IV A' employing next generation accelerometer was introduced on this mission.

=== PSLV flight C36 ===
Remote umbilical fill and drain system was used on fourth stage for the first time reducing the countdown time by one day. Experimental avionics packages were flown bolted to fourth stage including "miniaturized advanced inertial navigation system" miniAINS, NavIC based positioning system, Vikram processor and new lithium-ion based power system. A video imaging system was also on board, consisting of five cameras which captured and live streamed various staging events.

=== PSLV flight C37 ===
PSLV C37 was launched from Satish Dhawan Space Centre, Sriharikota (SHAR) carrying a payload of 104 satellites from 6 countries around the world (Israel, Kazakhstan, Netherlands, Switzerland, United Arab Emirates and the United States). Of the 104 satellites, 96 were CubeSats made by Planet Labs and Spire Global, two San Francisco companies adding to their commercial satellite constellations.

The launch set the record for the largest number of spacecraft ever launched on a single rocket. The previous record was held by Russia, which in 2014 catapulted 37 satellites in a single launch, using a modified Intercontinental ballistic missile (ICBM). It was again broken by SpaceX on their Transporter-1 mission which carried 143 satellites on a single launch.

=== PSLV flight C48 ===
This was the 50th flight of the Polar Satellite Launch Vehicle. It was also the 75th launch from Sriharikota. The flight placed into orbit the RISAT-2BR1 and nine customer satellites for New Space India Ltd. It was the second flight of the PSLV in the QL configuration.

=== PSLV flight C51 ===
This was the 53rd flight of PSLV and the 50th successful flight of PSLV. This is the first dedicated commercial launch executed by NSIL. The mission successfully placed Amazônia-1 from Brazil, INPE and 18 other payload into its orbit.

=== PSLV flight C57 ===
Launched 10 days after the successful landing of ISRO's Moon mission, Chandrayaan-3, this mission carried the Aditya-L1 Mission satellite, the first Indian satellite dedicated to studying the Sun. Launch was successful and achieved its intended orbit nearly an hour later, and separated from its fourth stage. On 6 January 2024, Aditya-L1 spacecraft, India's first solar mission, has successfully entered its final orbit with a period of approximately 180 days around the first Sun-Earth Lagrangian point (L1), approximately 1.5 million kilometers from Earth.

== Failures ==
=== IRS-1E ===
On 20 September 1993, a PSLV D1, the first developmental flight rocket, failed during launch of IRS-1E. A significant attitude disturbance occurred during second to third-stage separation, causing the attitude control command to exceed its maximum value. Because of the programming error in the pitch control loop of the digital autopilot software in the guidance and control processor, the required reversal of command polarity did not take place, causing the pitch loop to become unstable, resulted in loss of attitude control and failure to achieve orbit. The attitude control disturbance was traced to failure of one of the retro rockets designed to pull the burnt second stage away from the third stage. The vehicle crashed into the Bay of Bengal 700 seconds after takeoff.

=== IRS-1D ===
On 29 September 1997, a PSLV C1 rocket failed during launch of IRS-1D. Anomalous interaction between the primary and secondary pressure regulators of the fourth stage caused a reduction in propellant flow and thrust after 250 seconds of burn time. As a result, the fourth stage was shut down by a software override timer after burning 435 seconds, before reaching the target orbit or depleting propellant. The injection velocity was 140 m/s low, resulting in an orbit of 301 x 823 km instead of the planned 817 km circular SSO. Initially, a leak of helium gas from one of the components in the fourth stage was suspected, similar to recent Long March 3 launch failure, but later ruled out. Resulting orbit was partially corrected using satellite's on-board thrusters, thereby raising the perigee to 737 km, while the apogee remained at 821 km.

=== IRNSS-1H ===
PSLV-C39 carrying IRNSS-1H was launched on 31 August 2017 at 13:30 UTC from Second Launch Pad of Satish Dhawan Space Centre (SHAR). After about 203 seconds of flight payload fairing failed to be jettisoned as planned. Despite completing rest of the flight with all other systems working as expected, with about 1000 kg of extra weight orbit achieved was 167.4 x 6554.8 km at 19.18° inclination well below the intended 284 x 20650 km at 19.2° inclination. After fourth stage engine cut off IRNSS-1H separation occurred, leaving it adrift inside the closed payload fairing. This was second event of total failure in PSLV launch history since 1993.

=== EOS-09 ===
PSLV-C61 carrying EOS-09 was launched on 18 May 2025. The first and second stages performed nominally, but the rocket lost control during the third stage burn. This was the first launch failure since 2017.

=== EOS-N1 ===
PSLV-C62 carrying EOS-N1 was launched on 12 January 2026. The first and second stages performed nominally, but the rocket lost control during the waning moments of the third stage burn and spun off.

== Statistics ==
=== Rocket configurations ===
- PSLV-G
- PSLV-CA
- PSLV-XL
- PSLV-DL
- PSLV-QL

=== Launch sites ===
- Satish Dhawan First LP
- Satish Dhawan Second LP

=== Launch outcomes ===
- Failure
- Partial failure
- Success
- Scheduled

== Launch history ==
=== 1993–2009 ===
As of 12 January 2026, the PSLV has made 63 launches, with 58 successfully reaching their planned orbits, four outright failures and one partial failure, yielding a success rate of 92% (or 94% including the partial failure). All launches have occurred from the Satish Dhawan Space Centre, known before 2002 as the Sriharikota Range (SHAR).

=== 1993–1999 ===
Flight No.	Date / time (UTC)	Rocket, Configuration	Launch site	Payload	Payload mass	Orbit	User	Launch Outcome
D1	20 September 1993; 05:12	PSLV-G	First	(India) IRS-1E	846 kg			Failure
D1	Maiden flight; Attitude control failure at second stage separation.							
D2	15 October 1994; 05:05	PSLV-G	First	(India) IRS-P2	804 kg			Success
D3	21 March 1996; 04:53	PSLV-G	First	(India) IRS-P3	920 kg			Success
C1	29 September 1997; 04:47	PSLV-G	First	(India) IRS-1D	1250 kg			Partial failure
C1	First operational flight; Fourth stage under-performed resulting in lower than planned orbit. Satellite used own propulsion to move to correct orbit.							
C2	26 May 1999; 06:22	PSLV-G	First	(India) Oceansat-1 (Germany) DLR-Tubsat (South Korea) Kitsat-3	1050 kg 45 kg 107 kg			Success
C2	First launch to have foreign satellites, and first to carry multiple satellites.							
=== 2001–2005 ===
Flight No.	Date / time (UTC)	Rocket, Configuration	Launch site	Payload	Payload mass	Orbit	User	Launch Outcome
C3	22 October 2001; 04:53	PSLV-G	First	(India) TES (Belgium) (Europe) PROBA (Germany) BIRD	1108 kg 94 kg 92 kg			Success
C3	First multi-orbit mission. TES and BIRD were injected into a nominal 568 km circular sun-synchronous polar orbit, PROBA was injected into a 568 X 638 km elliptic orbit. Orbit was raised using RCS thrusters on fourth stage.							
C4	12 September 2002; 10:23	PSLV-G	First	(India) MetSat-1 (Kalpana-1)	1060 kg			Success
C4	India's first launch to GTO. GTO payload capability has reached 1200 kg from 2002 onward, compared to 1050 kg previously. First use of lightweight carbon composite payload adapter.							
C5	17 October 2003; 04:52	PSLV-G	First	(India) RESOURCESAT-1 (IRS-P6)	1360 kg			Success
C5	Payload capability had been progressively increased by more than 600 kg since the first PSLV launch. Launch took place despite heavy rain.							
C6	5 May 2005; 04:45	PSLV-G	Second	(India) Cartosat-1 (India) HAMSAT	1560 kg 42.5 kg			Success
C6	First PSLV launch from the second launch pad.							
=== 2007 ===
Flight No.	Date / time (UTC)	Rocket, Configuration	Launch site	Payload	Payload mass	Orbit	User	Launch Outcome
C7	10 January 2007; 03:54	PSLV-G	First	(India) Cartosat-2 (India) SRE-1 (Indonesia) LAPAN-TUBsat (Argentina) PEHUENSAT-1	680 kg 500 kg 56 kg 6 kg			Success
C7	First flight of hardware upgrade, first launch of reentry capsule (SRE).							
C8	23 April 2007; 10:00	PSLV-CA	Second	(Italy) AGILE (India) AAM (attached to PS4)	352 kg 185 kg			Success
C8	First flight of the 'Core-Alone' configuration. ISRO's first commercial launch (foreign satellite as the main payload).							
=== 2008 ===
Flight No.	Date / time (UTC)	Rocket, Configuration	Launch site	Payload	Payload mass	Orbit	User	Launch Outcome
C10	21 January 2008; 03:45	PSLV-CA	First	(Israel) TecSAR	295 kg			Success
C10	ISRO's second commercial launch (foreign satellite as the main payload).							
C9	28 April 2008; 03:53	PSLV-CA	Second	(India) Cartosat-2A (India) IMS-1/TWSAT (Germany) RUBIN-8 (Canada) CanX-6/NTS (Canada) CanX-2 (Japan) CUTE-1.7 + APD II (Netherlands) Delfi-C3 (Japan) SEEDS-2 (Germany) COMPASS-1 (Denmark) AAUSAT-II	690 kg 83 kg 8 kg 6.5 kg 3.5 kg 3 kg 2.2 kg 1 kg 1 kg 0.75 kg			Success
C11	22 October 2008; 00:52	PSLV-XL	Second	(India) Chandrayaan-1	1380 kg			Success
C11	First flight of the PSLV-XL configuration, first Indian Lunar probe.							
=== 2009 ===
Flight No.	Date / time (UTC)	Rocket, Configuration	Launch site	Payload	Payload mass	Orbit	User	Launch Outcome
C12	20 April 2009; 01:15	PSLV-CA	Second	(India) RISAT-2 (India) ANUSAT	300 kg 40 kg			Success
C12	India's first radar imaging satellite, RISAT.							
C14	23 September 2009; 06:21	PSLV-CA	First	(India) Oceansat-2 (Germany) (Luxembourg) Rubin 9.1 (attached to PS4) (Germany) (Luxembourg) Rubin 9.2 (attached to PS4) (Switzerland) SwissCube-1 (Germany) BeeSat (Germany) UWE-2 (Turkey) ITUpSAT1	960 kg 8 kg 8 kg 1 kg 1 kg 1 kg 1 kg			Success
C14	Rubin 9.1 and 9.2 intentionally remained attached to the fourth stage. SwissCube-1 was the first Swiss satellite, and ITUpSAT1 was the first satellite to be constructed in Turkey.							

=== 2010 ===
Flight No.	Date / time (UTC)	Rocket, Configuration	Launch site	Payload	Payload mass	Orbit	User	Launch Outcome
C15	12 July 2010; 03:52	PSLV-CA	First	(India) Cartosat-2B (Algeria) ALSAT-2A (Norway) AISSat-1 (Switzerland) TIsat-1 (India) STUDSAT	694 kg 117 kg 6.5 kg 1 kg 0.95 kg			Success
C15	AISSat-1 and TIsat are part of NLS-6.							
=== 2011 ===
Flight No.	Date / time (UTC)	Rocket, Configuration	Launch site	Payload	Payload mass	Orbit	User	Launch Outcome
C16	20 April 2011; 04:42	PSLV-G	First	(India) ResourceSat-2 (Singapore) X-Sat (India) (Russia) YouthSat	1206 kg 106 kg 92 kg			Success
C17	15 July 2011; 11:18	PSLV-XL	Second	(India) GSAT-12	1410 kg			Success
C17	First use of Vikram flight computer.							
C18	12 October 2011; 05:31	PSLV-CA	First	(India) (France) Megha-Tropiques (India) SRMSAT (India) Jugnu (Luxembourg) VesselSat-1	1000 kg 10.9 kg 3 kg 28.7 kg			Success
=== 2012 ===
Flight No.	Date / time (UTC)	Rocket, Configuration	Launch site	Payload	Payload mass	Orbit	User	Launch Outcome
C19	26 April 2012; 00:17	PSLV-XL	First	(India) RISAT-1	1858 kg			Success
C21	9 September 2012; 04:23	PSLV-CA	First	(France) SPOT-6 (India) mRESINS (attached to PS4) (Japan) PROITERES	720 kg 50 kg 15 kg			Success
C21	mRESINS tested avionics for future PSLV launches. ISRO's third commercial launch (foreign satellite as the main payload). ISRO's 100th mission.							
=== 2013 ===
Flight No.	Date / time (UTC)	Rocket, Configuration	Launch site	Payload	Payload mass	Orbit	User	Launch Outcome
C20	25 February 2013; 12:31	PSLV-CA	First	(India) (France) SARAL (Canada) Sapphire (Canada) NEOSSat (Austria) TUGSAT-1 (Austria) UniBRITE-1 (United Kingdom) STRaND-1 (Denmark) AAUSAT3	409 kg 148 kg 74 kg 14 kg 14 kg 6.5 kg 0.8 kg			Success
C20	TUGSAT-1 and UniBRITE were the first Austrian satellites.							
C22	1 July 2013; 18:11	PSLV-XL	First	(India) IRNSS-1A	1425 kg			Success
C22	India's first regional navigation satellite.							
C25	5 November 2013; 09:08	PSLV-XL	First	(India) Mars Orbiter Mission	1350 kg			Success
C25	India's first Mars mission.							
=== 2014 ===
Flight No.	Date / time (UTC)	Rocket, Configuration	Launch site	Payload	Payload mass	Orbit	User	Launch Outcome
C24	4 April 2014; 11:44	PSLV-XL	First	(India) IRNSS-1B	1432 kg			Success
C24	India's second regional navigation satellite.							
C23	30 June 2014; 04:22	PSLV-CA	First	(France) SPOT-7 (Canada) CanX-4 (Canada) CanX-5 (Germany) AISAT (Singapore) VELOX-1	714 kg 15 kg 15 kg 14 kg 7 kg			Success
C23	ISRO's fourth commercial launch (foreign satellite as the main payload).							
C26	16 October 2014; 20:02	PSLV-XL	First	(India) IRNSS-1C	1425.4 kg			Success
C26	Seventh PSLV-XL and third Navigation Satellite launch.							
=== 2015 ===
Flight No.	Date / time (UTC)	Rocket, Configuration	Launch site	Payload	Payload mass	Orbit	User	Launch Outcome
C27	28 March 2015; 11:49	PSLV-XL	Second	(India) IRNSS-1D	1425 kg			Success
C27	Eighth PSLV-XL and fourth Navigation Satellite launch.							
C28	10 July 2015; 16:28	PSLV-XL	First	(United Kingdom) UK-DMC3A (United Kingdom) UK-DMC3B (United Kingdom) UK-DMC3C (United Kingdom) CBNT-1 (United Kingdom) DeOrbitSail	447 kg 447 kg 447 kg 91 kg 7 kg			Success
C28	First international customer for XL Variant. At the time it was the heaviest commercial mission (1439 kg) successfully accomplished using a launch vehicle assembled by ISRO.							
C30	28 September 2015; 04:30	PSLV-XL	First	(India) Astrosat (Indonesia) LAPAN-A2 (Canada) exactView 9 (United States) Lemur-2 #1 Joel (United States) Lemur-2 #2 Peter (United States) Lemur-2 #3 Jeroen (United States) Lemur-2 #4 Chris	1650 kg 68 kg 5.5 kg 4 kg 4 kg 4 kg 4 kg			Success
C30	Launch of India's first dedicated multi-wavelength space observatory and ISRO's first launch of US satellites.							
C29	16 December 2015; 12:30	PSLV-CA	First	(Singapore) TeLEOS-1 (Singapore) VELOX-C1 (Singapore) VELOX-II (Singapore) Kent Ridge-1 (Singapore) Galassia (Singapore) Athenoxat-1	400 kg 123 kg 13 kg 78 kg 3.4 kg 4.8 kg			Success
C29	Commercial launch of 6 Singaporean satellites. Fourth stage re-ignition demonstrated successfully after payload deployment.							
=== 2016 ===
Flight No.	Date / time (UTC)	Rocket, Configuration	Launch site	Payload	Payload mass	Orbit	User	Launch Outcome
C31	20 January 2016; 04:01	PSLV-XL	Second	(India) IRNSS-1E	1425 kg			Success
C31	IRNSS-1E, fifth navigation satellite of the seven satellites constituting the IRNSS space segment launched. It carries two types of payloads – navigation payload and ranging payload. This is the eleventh time "XL" configuration is being flown.							
C32	10 March 2016; 10:31	PSLV-XL	Second	(India) IRNSS-1F	1425 kg			Success
C32	IRNSS-1F, sixth navigation satellite of the seven satellites constituting the IRNSS space segment launched. It carries two types of payloads – navigation payload and ranging payload. This is the twelfth time "XL" configuration is being flown. IRNSS-1F carries Corner Cube Retroreflectors for laser ranging. Launch initially scheduled for 10:30 was delayed by one minute to avoid space debris.							
C33	28 April 2016; 07:20	PSLV-XL	First	(India) IRNSS-1G	1425 kg			Success
C33	IRNSS-1G, last navigation satellite of the seven satellites constituting the IRNSS space segment launched. India's own navigational system, the set-up for which was completed will be called NAVIC (Navigation with Indian Constellation)							
C34	22 June 2016; 03:55	PSLV-XL	Second	(India) Cartosat-2C (Indonesia) LAPAN-A3 (Germany) BIROS (United States) SkySat Gen2-1 (Canada) GHGSat-D (Canada) M3MSat (India) Swayam (India) SathyabamaSat (United States) 12 × Flock-2P Dove (satellite)	727.5 kg 120 kg 130 kg 110 kg 25.5 kg 85 kg 1 kg 1.5 kg 12 × 4.7 kg			Success
C34	ISRO's Cartosat-2C and 19 other satellites launched.							
C35	26 September 2016; 03:42	PSLV-G	First	(India) ScatSat-1 (Algeria) ALSAT-2B (Algeria) ALSAT-1B (United States) Pathfinder-1 (India) Pratham (Canada) CanX-7 (NLS-19) (Algeria) ALSAT-1N (India) PISat	371 kg 117 kg 103 kg 44 kg 10 kg 8 kg 7 kg 5.25 kg			Success
C35	ISRO's longest PSLV satellite launch mission. First mission of PSLV in which it launched its payloads into two different orbits.							
C36	7 December 2016; 04:55	PSLV-XL	First	(India) Resourcesat-2A	1235 kg			Success
=== 2017 ===
Flight No.	Date / time (UTC)	Rocket, Configuration	Launch site	Payload	Payload mass	Orbit	User	Launch Outcome
C37	15 February 2017; 03:58	PSLV-XL	First	(India) Cartosat-2D (India) INS-1A (India) INS-1B (United Arab Emirates) Nayif-1 CubeSats (Kazakhstan) Al Farabi-1 (Netherlands) (Germany) (Belgium) (Israel) PEASSS (Israel) BGUSAT (Switzerland) (Israel) DIDO-2 (United States) Doves Flock-3P (United States) Lemur-2	730 kg 8.4 kg 9.7 kg 1.1 kg 1.7 kg 3 kg 4.3 kg 4.2 kg 4.7 kg x 88; 4.6 kg x 8			Success
C37	PSLV-C37 successfully carried and deployed a record 104 satellites in the sun-synchronous orbit.							
C38	23 June 2017; 03:59	PSLV-XL	First	(India) Cartosat-2E (India) NIUSAT (Japan) CESAT-1 (United States) Lemur-2 × 8 (United Kingdom) , (Australia) , (Israel) Blue, Red, Green Diamonds (Italy) , (Germany) Max Valier Sat (Latvia) Venta-1 (Italy) D-Sat (Finland) Aalto-1 (Germany) COMPASS-2/Dragsail QB50 (United Kingdom) InflateSail QB50 (Italy) URSA MAIOR QB50 (Lithuania) LituanicaSAT-2 QB50 (Austria) PEGASUS QB50 (China) NUDTSat QB50 (Czech Republic) VZLUSAT1 QB50 (United Kingdom) UCLSat QB50 (Chile) SUCHAI (France) ROBUSTA-1B (Slovakia) skCUBE (United States) CICERO-6 (United States) Tyvak-53b (PacSciSat) (United States) KickSat Sprites × 6 (All flown with Venta-1 and Max Valier Sat)	727 kg 15 kg 60 kg 4 kg x 8; 18 kg 15 kg 7.5 kg 4.5 kg 4 kg 4 kg 4 kg 3 kg 4 kg 2 kg 2 kg 2 kg 2 kg 1 kg 1 kg 1 kg ? kg ? kg			Success
C38	Post mission PSLV fourth stage (PS4) was lowered to 350 km altitude and carried Ionization Density and Electric field Analyzer (IDEA) payload by Space Physics Laboratory to measure electron density and electric field measurements in the F region of the ionosphere							
C39	31 August 2017; 13:30	PSLV-XL	Second	(India) IRNSS-1H	1425 kg			Failure
C39	Payload fairing (heat shield) failed to separate, causing the satellite to remain inside the fairing with the payload dispenser detaching the satellite internally. Second PSLV failure in 24 years, the first one being PSLV-D1.							
=== 2018 ===
Flight No.	Date / time (UTC)	Rocket, Configuration	Launch site	Payload	Payload mass	Orbit	User	Launch Outcome
C40	12 January 2018; 03:59	PSLV-XL	First	(India) Cartosat-2F (India) MICROSAT-TD (India) INS-1C (Canada) LEO-1 (United Kingdom) Carbonite-2 aka (VividX2) (Finland) ICEYE X1 (United States) Landmapper-BC3 (United States) Arkyd 6A (United States) CICERO-7 (United States) 4 x Doves Flock-3p' (United States) 4 x Lemur-2 (France) PicSat (South Korea) SIGMA (KHUSAT-03) (South Korea) CANYVAL-X (Tom and Jerry) (South Korea) CNUSail 1 (South Korea) KAUSAT 5 (South Korea) STEP Cube Lab (United States) MicroMAS-2 (United States) Fox-1D (United States) 4 x SpaceBEE (United States) Tyvak-61C (GeoStare) (United States) DemoSat-2	710 kg ~120 kg 11 kg 168 kg 100 kg ?? kg 10 kg 10 kg 10 kg 4 x ?? kg 4 x ?? kg 3.5 kg 3.8 kg 4 kg 4 kg 3.2 kg 1 kg 3.8 kg 1.5 kg 1.27 kg 4 kg ? kg			Success
C41	11 April 2018; 22:34	PSLV-XL	First	(India) IRNSS-1I	~1425 kg	sub GTO		Success
C42	16 September 2018; 16:38	PSLV-CA	First	(United Kingdom) NovaSAR-S (445 kg) (United Kingdom) SSTL S1-4 (444 kg)	889 kg	Low Earth	SSTL	Success
C43	29 November 2018; 04:28	PSLV-CA	First	(India) HySIS (United States) Doves × 16 (Flock 3r) (United States) Global-1 (United States) Lemur-2 × 4 (United States) HSAT-1 (United States) CICERO-8 (Netherlands) Hiber-1 (Colombia) FACSAT-1 (Malaysia) Innosat-2 (Australia) Centauri-1 (Canada) CASE (Finland) Reaktor Hello World (Catalonia) ³Cat-1	380 kg 16 x ?? kg 55 kg 4 x ?? kg 13 kg 10 kg ?? kg ?? kg 4 kg ?? ?? ?? 1.2 kg	Low Earth		Success
=== 2019 ===
Flight No.	Date / time (UTC)	Rocket, Configuration	Launch site	Payload	Payload mass	Orbit	User	Launch Outcome
C44	25 January 2019; 18:07	PSLV-DL	First	(India) Microsat-R (India) Kalamsat V2 (attached to PS4)	740 kg 1.2 kg	Low Earth	DRDO; Space Kidz	Success
C44	First flight of PSLV-DL variant. Propellant tank on fourth stage (PS4) made out of Aluminum alloy instead of Ti-6Al-4V.							
C45	1 April 2019; 03:57	PSLV-QL	Second	(India) EMISAT (United States) Doves × 20 (Flock 4a) (United States) Lemur-2 × 4 (Lithuania) M6P (Lithuania) BlueWalker1 (Spain) Aistechsat-3 (Switzerland) Astrocast-2 (India) ExseedSat-2 (attached to PS4) (India) ARIS 101F (attached to PS4) (India) ISRO AIS payload (attached to PS4)	436 kg 5.7 kg each 5.2 kg each 6.8 kg 10 kg 2.3 kg 3.8 kg ? kg 10 kg ? kg	Low Earth	DRDO	Success
C45	Flight C45. EMISAT (436 kg) and rideshares (220 kg)							
C46	22 May 2019; 00:00	PSLV-CA	First	(India) RISAT-2B	615 kg	Low Earth		Success
C46	Flight C46. RISAT-2B							
C47	27 November 2019; 03:58	PSLV-XL	Second	(India) Cartosat-3 (United States) Meshbed (United States) SuperDoves × 12 (Flock 4p)	1,625 kg 4.5 kg ? kg	Low Earth		Success
C47	Semi-Conductor Laboratory fabricated Vikram 1601 processor used for first time in navigation computer of launch vehicle after being test flown in redundant configuration on PSLV C46 mission.							
C48	11 December 2019; 09:55	PSLV-QL	First	(India) RISAT-2BR1 (Japan) QPS SAR-1 "Izanagi"「イザナギ」 (United States) Lemur-2 × 4 (Israel) Duchifat-3 (United States) 1HOPSAT (United States) Tyvak-0129 (Italy) Tyvak-0092 (COMMTRAIL/NANOVA)	628 kg ~100 kg ? kg 2.3 kg 22 kg 11 kg 5 kg	Low Earth		Success
C48	Flight C48 - 50th Flight of PSLV.							

=== 2020 ===
Flight No.	Date / time (UTC)	Rocket, Configuration	Launch site	Payload	Payload mass	Orbit	User	Launch Outcome
C49	7 November 2020; 09:42	PSLV-DL	First	(India) EOS-01 (formerly RISAT-2BR2) (United States) Lemur-2 × 4 (Luxembourg) KSM-1A, 1B, 1C, 1D (Lithuania) R2	630 kg ? ? ?	Low Earth		Success
C49	Second flight of PSLV-DL variant.							
C50	17 December 2020; 10:11	PSLV-XL	Second	(India) GSAT-12R (CMS-1)	1425 kg	sub GTO	ISRO	Success
=== 2021 ===
Flight No.	Date / time (UTC)	Rocket, Configuration	Launch site	Payload	Payload mass	Orbit	User	Launch Outcome
C51	28 February 2021; 04:54	PSLV-DL	First	(Brazil) Amazônia-1 (India) Satish Dhawan Sat (United States) SpaceBEE (×12) (United States) (Mexico) SAI-1 Nanoconnect-2 (India) SindhuNetra (India) UNITYSats (x3)	637 kg 1.9 kg ~4 kg x 12; N/A; 10 kg N/A	Low Earth		Success
C51	Flight C51.							
=== 2022 ===
Flight No.	Date / time (UTC)	Rocket, Configuration	Launch site	Payload	Payload mass	Orbit	User	Launch Outcome
C52	14 Feb 2022; 00:29	PSLV-XL	First	(India) EOS-4/RISAT-1A (India) (United States) (Taiwan) INSPIRESat-1 (India) (Bhutan) INS-2TD	1710 kg 8.7 kg 17.5 kg	Low Earth	ISRO	Success
C52	Flight C52, RISAT-1A satellite for Earth observation							
C53	30 June 2022; 12:32	PSLV-CA	Second	(Singapore) DS-EO (Singapore) NeuSAR (Singapore) SCOOB-I (India) 6 × payloads on POEM-1	365 kg 155 kg 2.8 kg	Low Earth	DSTA	Success
C53	Primary payload is DS-EO electro-optical satellite by Defence Science and Technology Agency with two other small satellites from Singapore to low Earth equatorial orbit. It also carries the PSLV Orbital Experimental Module (POEM) that is attached to upper stage to carry in-orbit experiments and carries 6 hosted payloads.							
C54	26 November 2022; 06:26	PSLV-XL	First	(India) Oceansat-3/EOS-6 (United States) (Switzerland) 4× Astrocast-2 (India) (Bhutan) BhutanSat (aka INS-2B) (India) Pixxel TD-1 Anand (India) Thybolt 1 & Thybolt 2	1117 kg 17.92 kg 18.28 kg 16.51 kg 1.45 kg	Low Earth	ISRO	Success
C54	Flight C54.							
=== 2023 ===
Flight No.	Date / time (UTC)	Rocket, Configuration	Launch site	Payload	Payload mass	Orbit	User	Launch Outcome
C55	22 April 2023; 08:50	PSLV-CA	First	(Singapore) TeLEOS-2 (Singapore) Lumelite-4 (India) 7 × payloads on POEM-2	741 kg 16 kg	Low Earth	DSTA	Success
C55	Flight C55, commercial launch by NSIL. First launch operation of a rocket partially assembled at PSLV Integration Facility (PIF) First flight of PSLV-CA without Aerodynamic Stabiliser (AST) modules.							
C56	30 July 2023; 01:01	PSLV-CA	First	(Singapore) DS-SAR (Singapore) Arcade (Singapore) Velox-AM (Singapore) (United Kingdom) ORB-12 STRIDER (Singapore) Galassia-2 (Singapore) SCOOB-II (Singapore) NuLIon	360 kg 50 kg	Low Earth	DSTA	Success
C56	Flight C56.							
C57	2 September 2023; 06:20	PSLV-XL	Second	(India) Aditya-L1	1480.7 kg	Halo orbit	ISRO	Success
C57	Flight C57, solar coronal observation mission							
=== 2024 ===
Flight No.	Date / time (UTC)	Rocket, Configuration	Launch site	Payload	Payload mass	Orbit	User	Launch Outcome
C58	1 January 2024; 03:40	PSLV-DL	First	(India) XPoSat (India) 10 × payloads on POEM-3	741 kg 16 kg	Low Earth	ISRO	Success
C58	Flight C58.							
C59	5 December 2024; 10:34	PSLV-XL	First	(Europe) PROBA-3 Occulter and Coronagraph	550 kg	Highly elliptical	ESA	Success
C59	Flight C59, commercial launch by NSIL. Proba-3 is a dual probe technology demonstration mission by the ESA for solar coronagraphy.							
C60	30 December 2024; 16:30	PSLV-CA	First	(India) SPADEX (Chaser + Target) (India) 24 × payloads on POEM-4	440 kg	Low Earth	ISRO	Success
C60	Flight C60.							
=== 2025 ===
Flight No.	Date / time (UTC)	Rocket, Configuration	Launch site	Payload	Payload mass	Orbit	User	Launch Outcome
C61	18 May 2025; 00:29	PSLV-XL	First	(India) EOS-09 (RISAT-1B)	1,696 kg	Low Earth	ISRO	Failure
C61	Flight C61. Third stage had a fall in chamber pressure during flight and payload was lost. Third failure of PSLV.							
=== 2026 ===
Flight No.	Date / time (UTC)	Rocket, Configuration	Launch site	Payload	Payload mass	Orbit	User	Launch Outcome
C62	12 January 2026; 04:48:30	PSLV-DL	First	(India) EOS-N1 (Spain) (France) KID Capsule (United Kingdom) (Thailand) Theos-2 (Nepal) Munal (India) CGUSAT (India) DSUSAT (India) MOI-1 (India) LACHIT (India) Thybolt-3 (India) Sanskarsat (India) AyulSat (Brazil) GalaxySat-1 (Galaxy Explorer) (Brazil) Edusat (Brazil) Uaisat (Brazil) Orbital Temple (Brazil) Aldebaran-1		Low Earth	DRDO	Failure
C62	Return to flight mission following failure on PSLV-C61. EOS-N1 and Additional 15 rideshare payloads. Roll anomaly during third stage burn.							

== Future launches ==
Date / time (UTC)	Flight	Rocket, Configuration	Launch site	Payload	Orbit	User
November 2026	C63	PSLV-XL	TBD	(India) TDS-1	GTO	ISRO
November 2026	Technology Demonstrator Satellite 01 mission. Flight C63.					
January 2027	N1	PSLV-XL	TBD	(India) Oceansat-3A	Low Earth	ISRO
January 2027	First fully privately built PSLV.					
2026	C64	PSLV-XL	TBD	(India) Cartosat-3A	Low Earth	ISRO
2026	Flight C64.					
2026	C65	PSLV-XL	FLP	(India) ANVESHA	Low Earth	DRDO
2026	Flight C65.					
TBA	N2	PSLV	TBD	(India) NSIL Payload		ISRO
TBA	Second fully privately built PSLV.					
October 2027	C?	PSLV	TBD	(India) (France) TRISHNA	SSO	ISRO, CNES
October 2027	The Trishna mission is designed to observe Earth's surface in the thermal infrared domain.					
TBA	TBD	PSLV	TBD	(Singapore) NS2	Low Earth	ST Engineering
TBA	NSIL Commercial Mission					
2027	TBD	PSLV	TBD	(Japan) ISSA-J1	Low Earth	MEXT, Astroscale
2027	A satellite for On-orbit inspection demonstration that will image and diagnose a large, defunct satellite in space.					

== Gallery ==
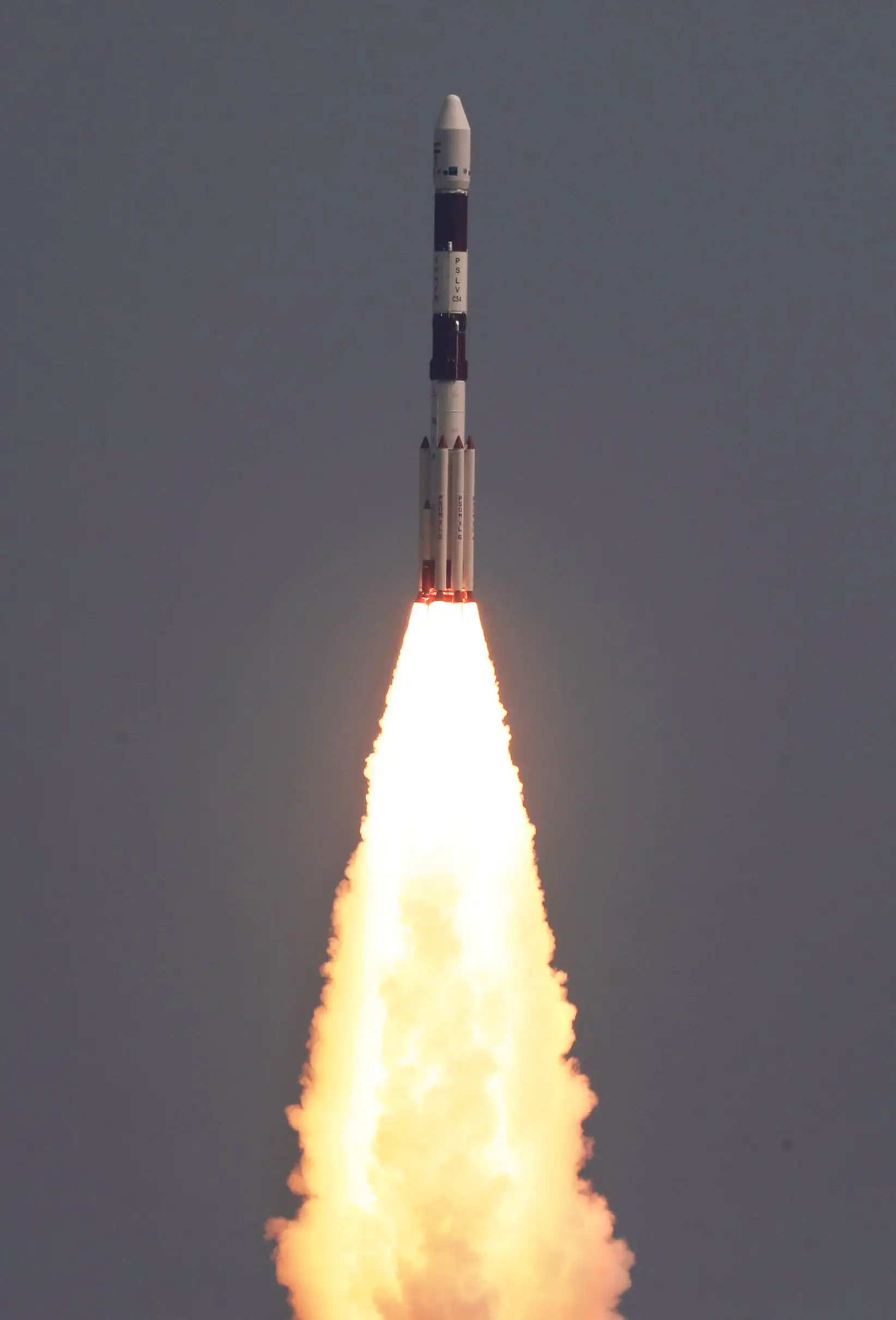
PSLV - C54 Liffed off from Satish Dhawan Space Center's, First Launch Pad.

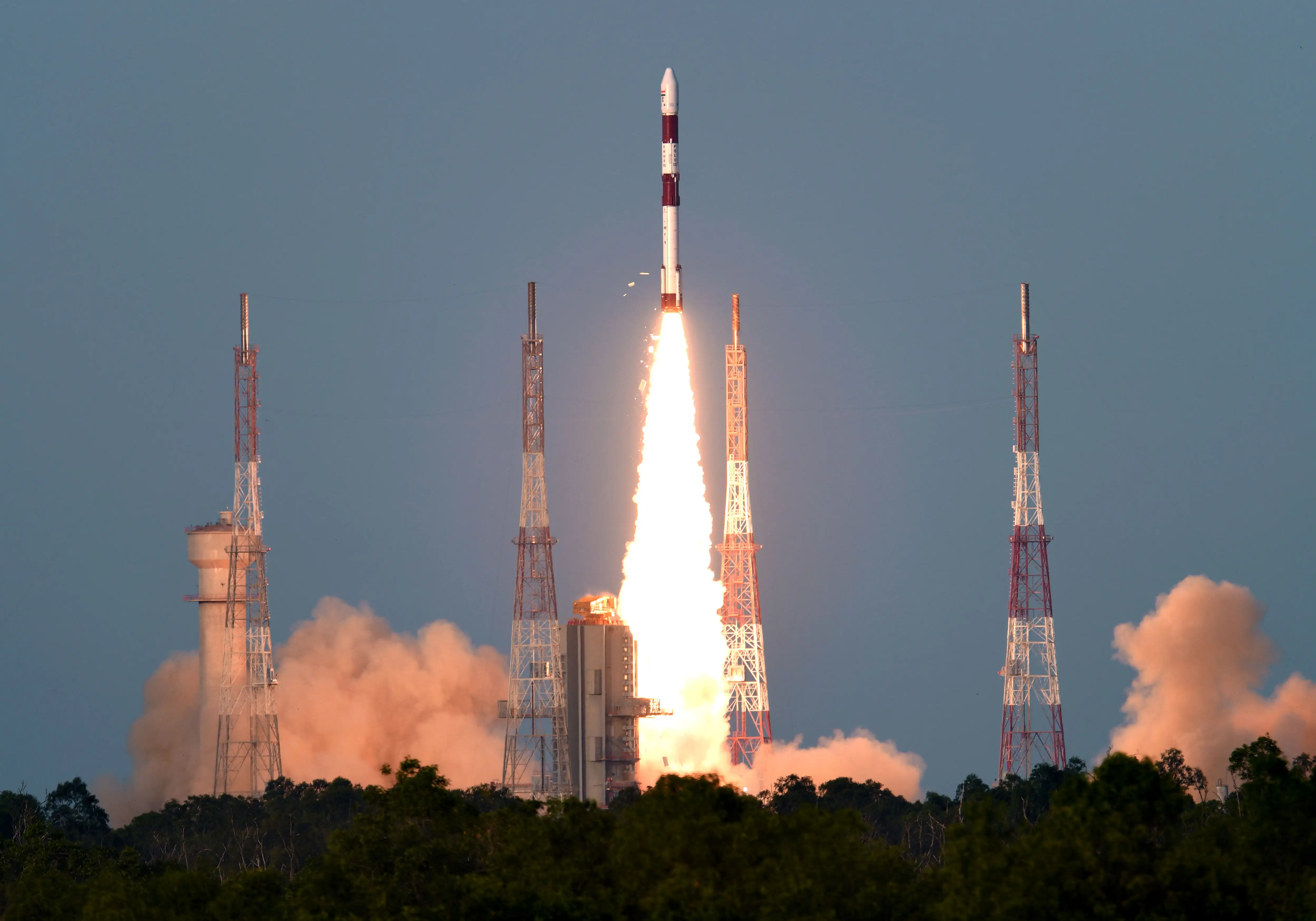
PSLV C53 Clears Second Launch Pad of Satish Dhawan Space Centre, Shriharikota

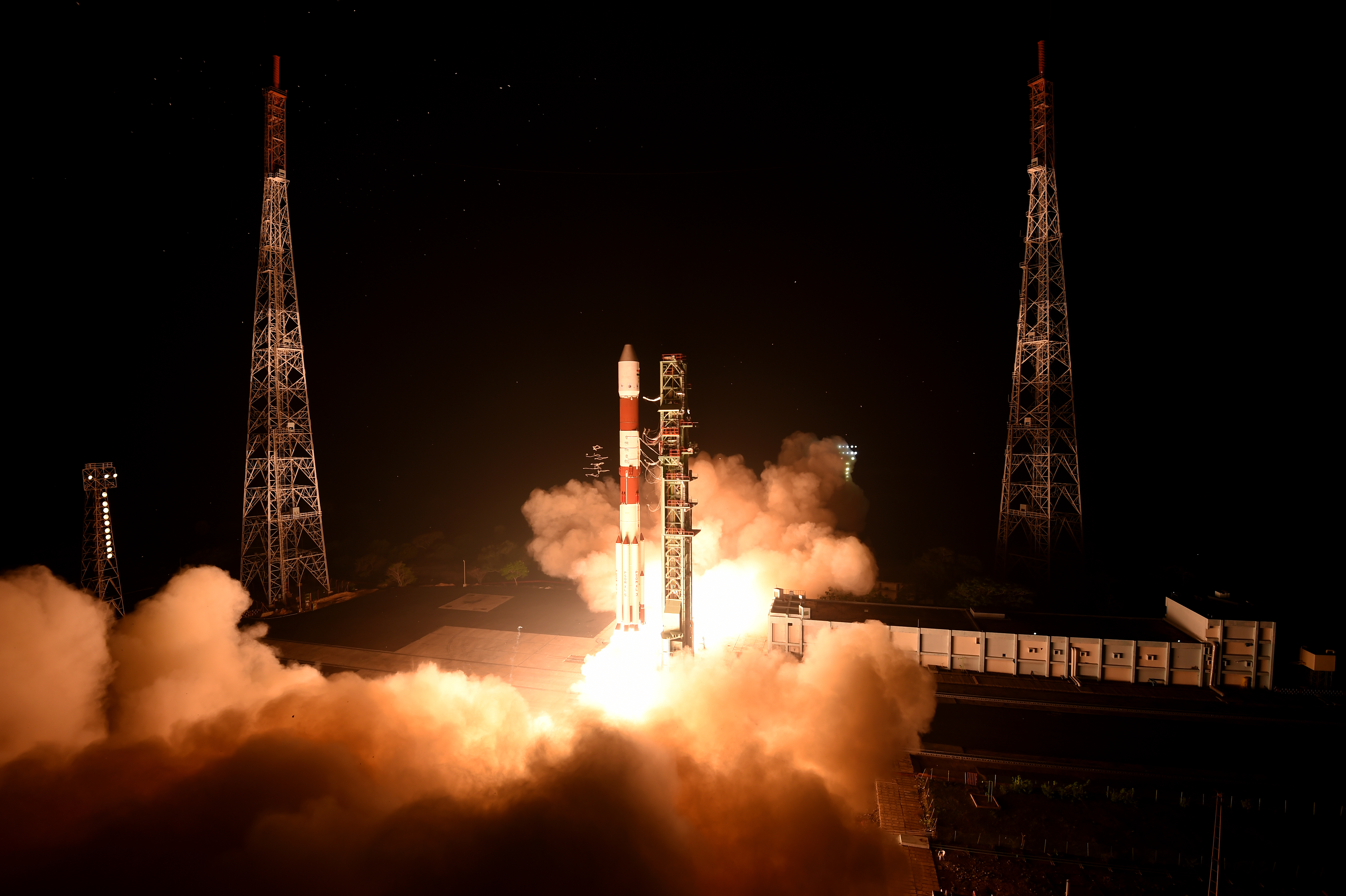
PSLV C52 lifting off from First Launch Pad

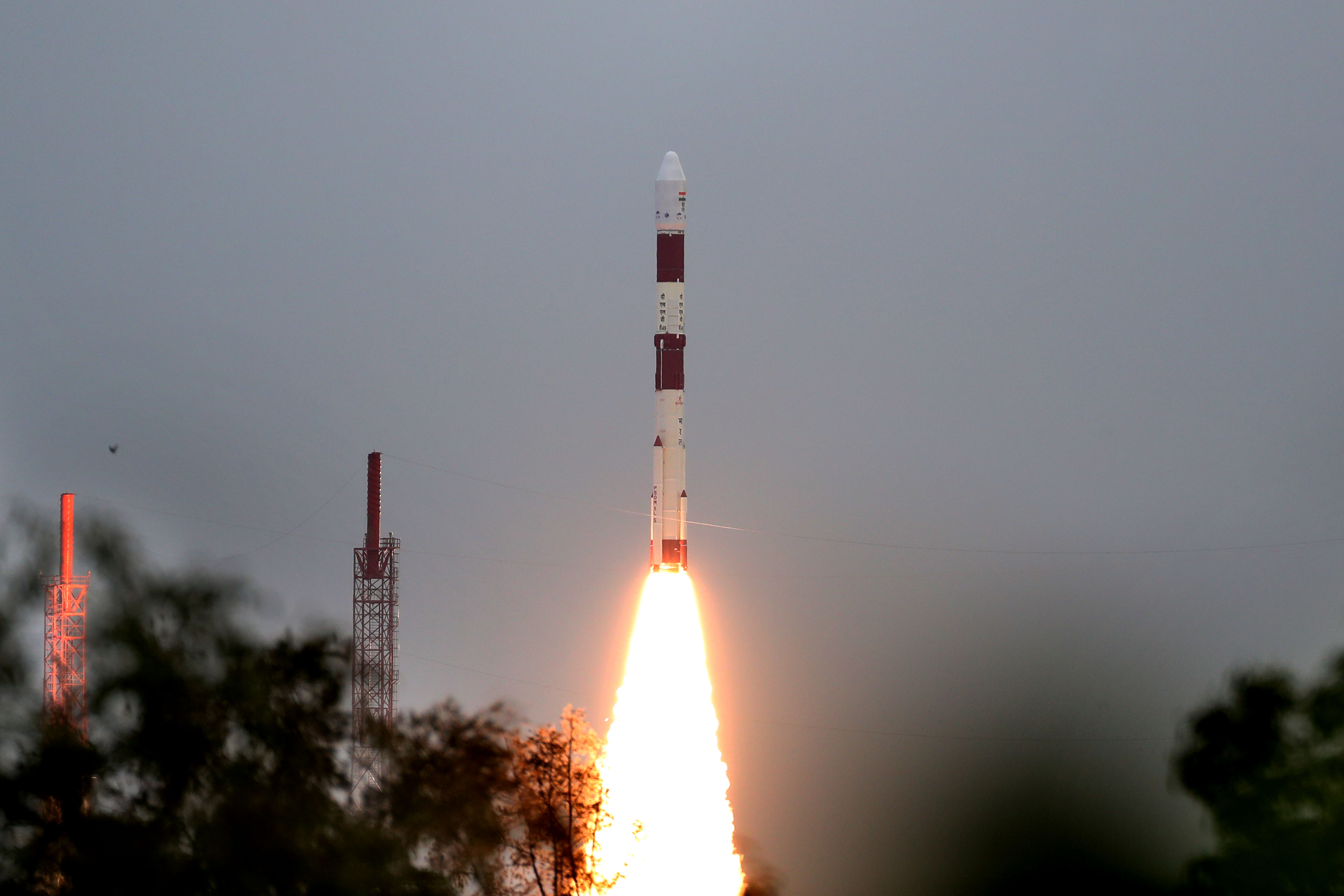
PSLV-C49 lift off

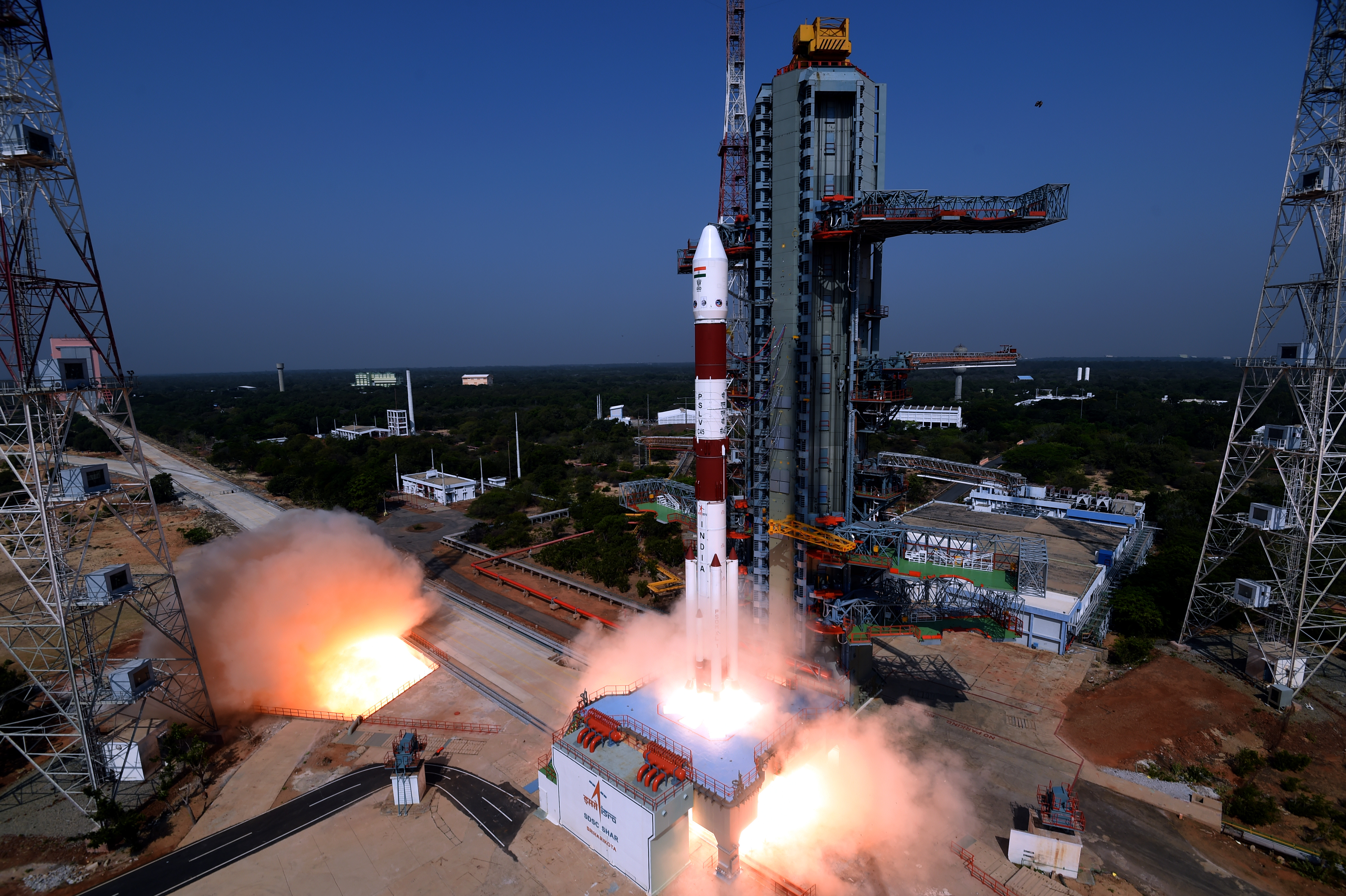
PSLV C45 ignition

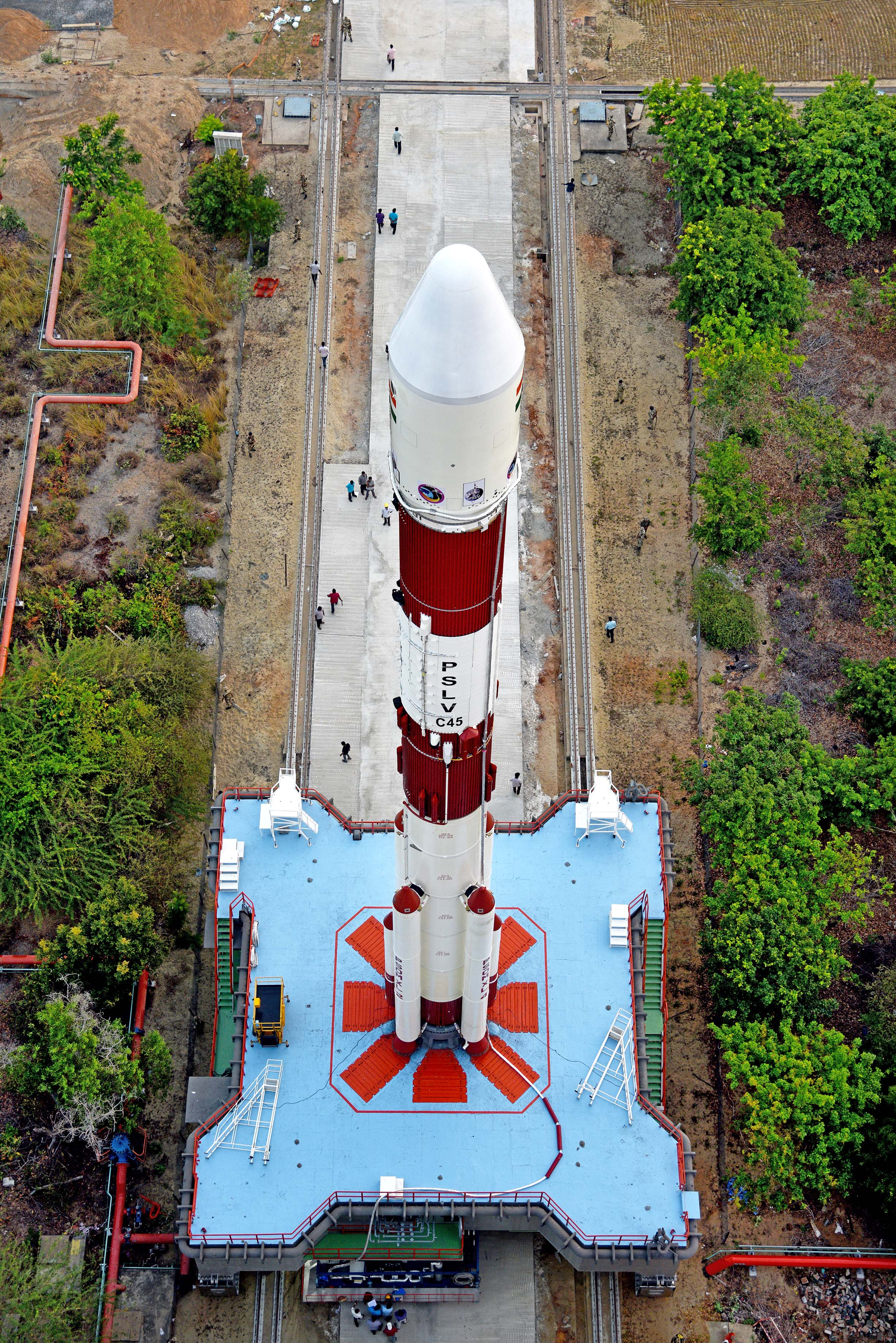
Top view of PSLV C45

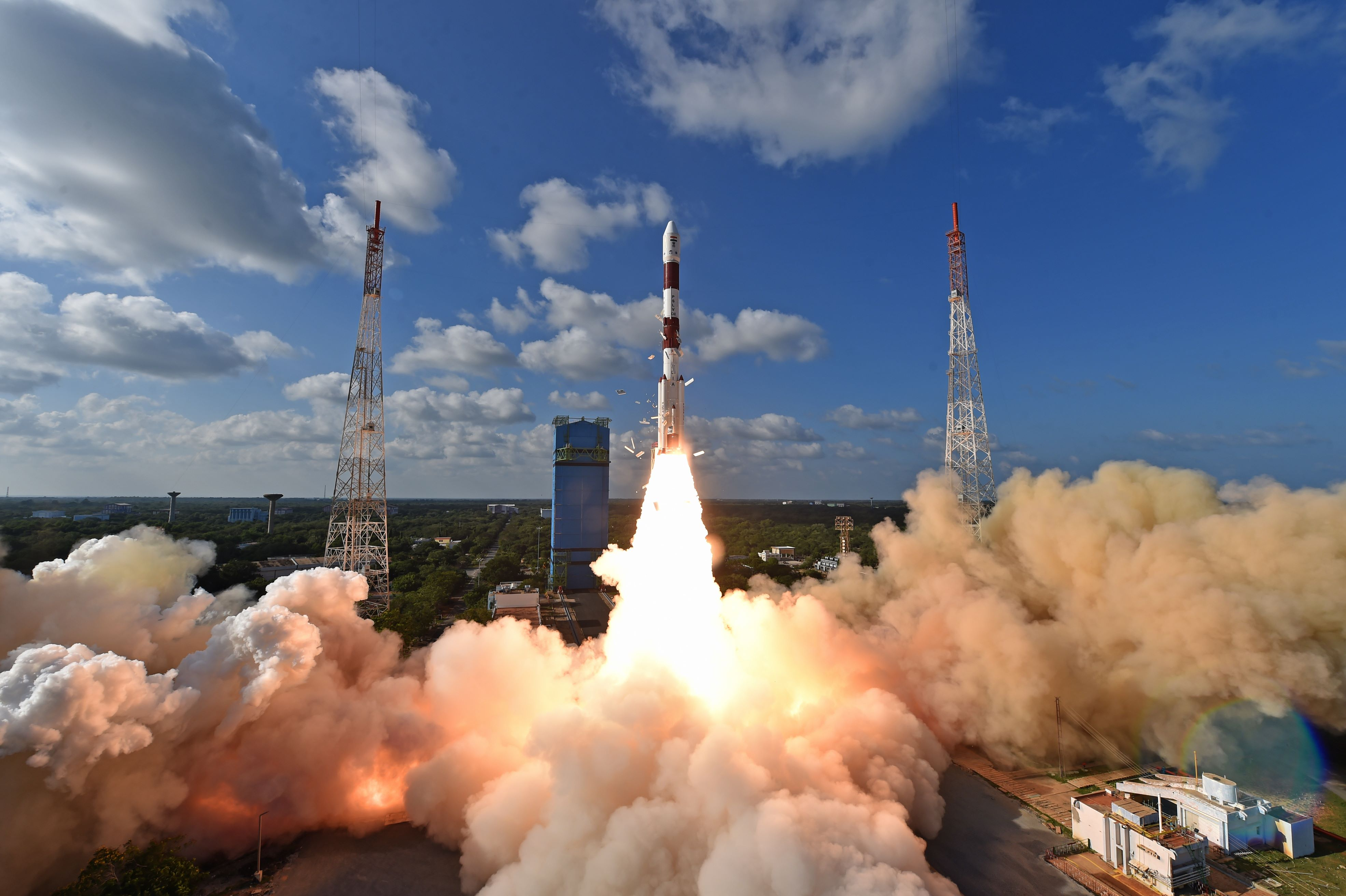
PSLV C48 RISAT-2BR1 lift-off from First Launch Pad

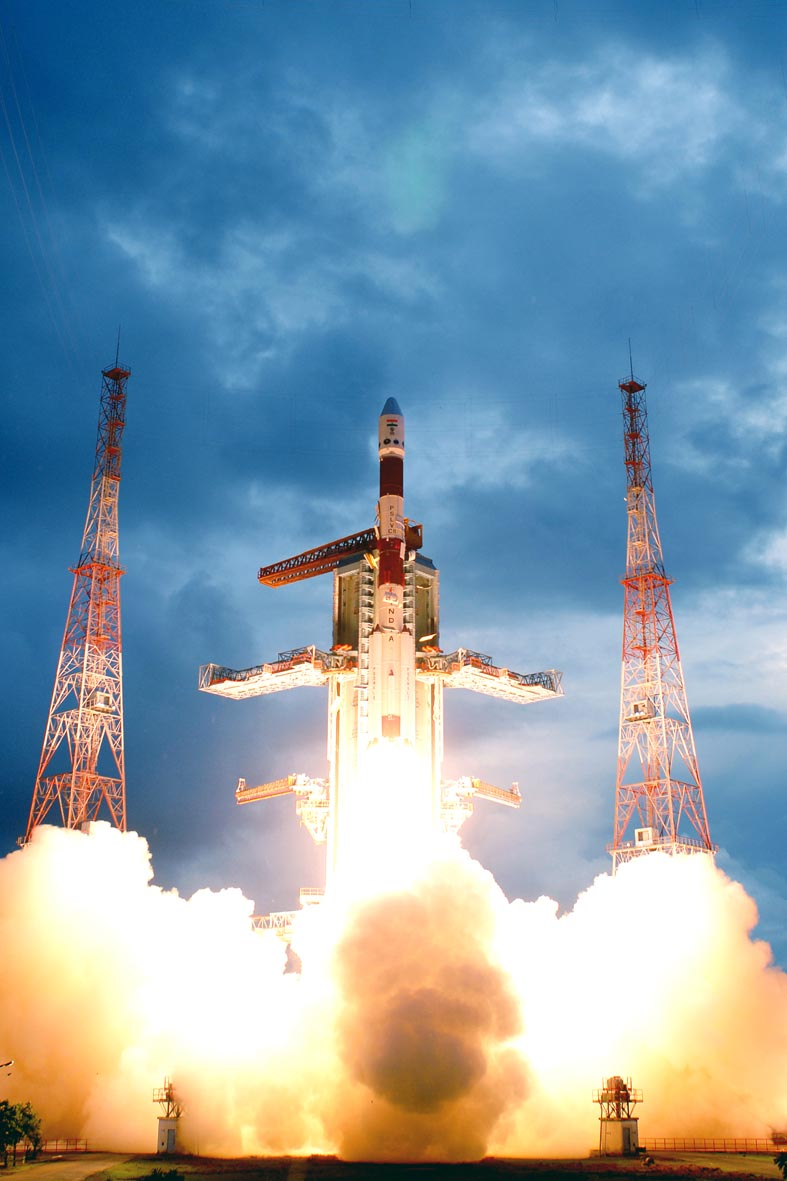
PSLV C11 lift off

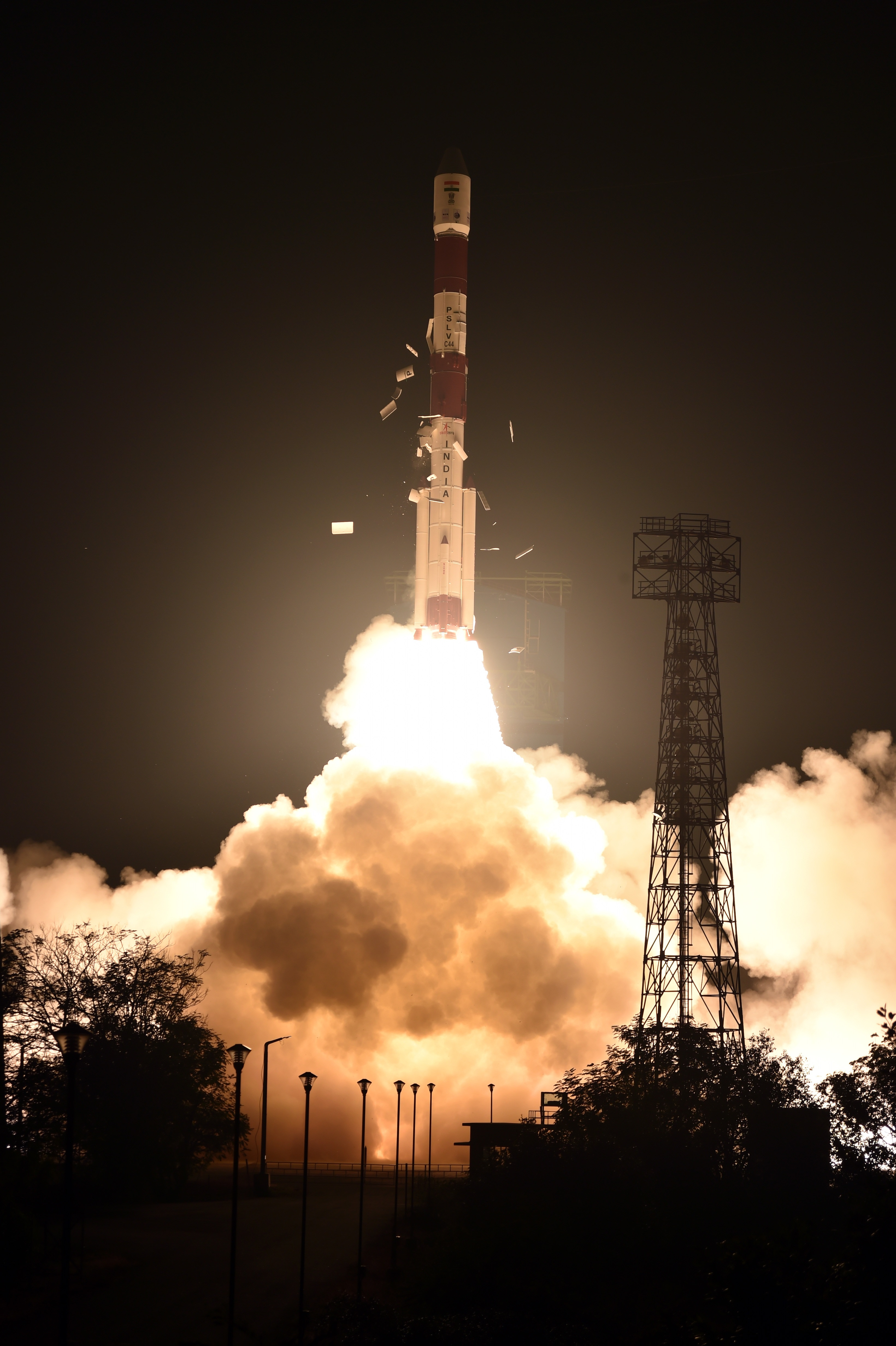
PSLV C44 lift off

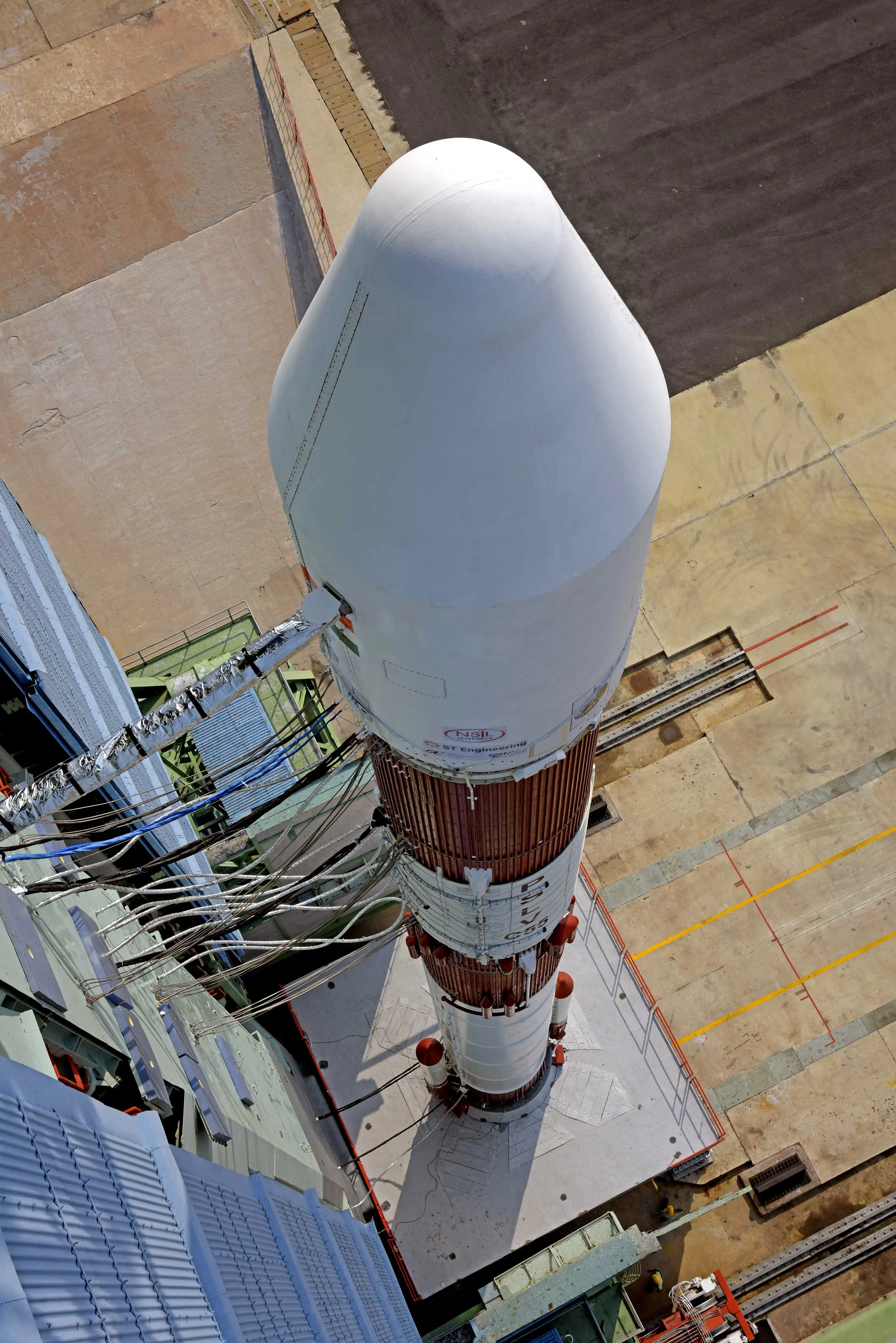
Integrated PSLV rocket

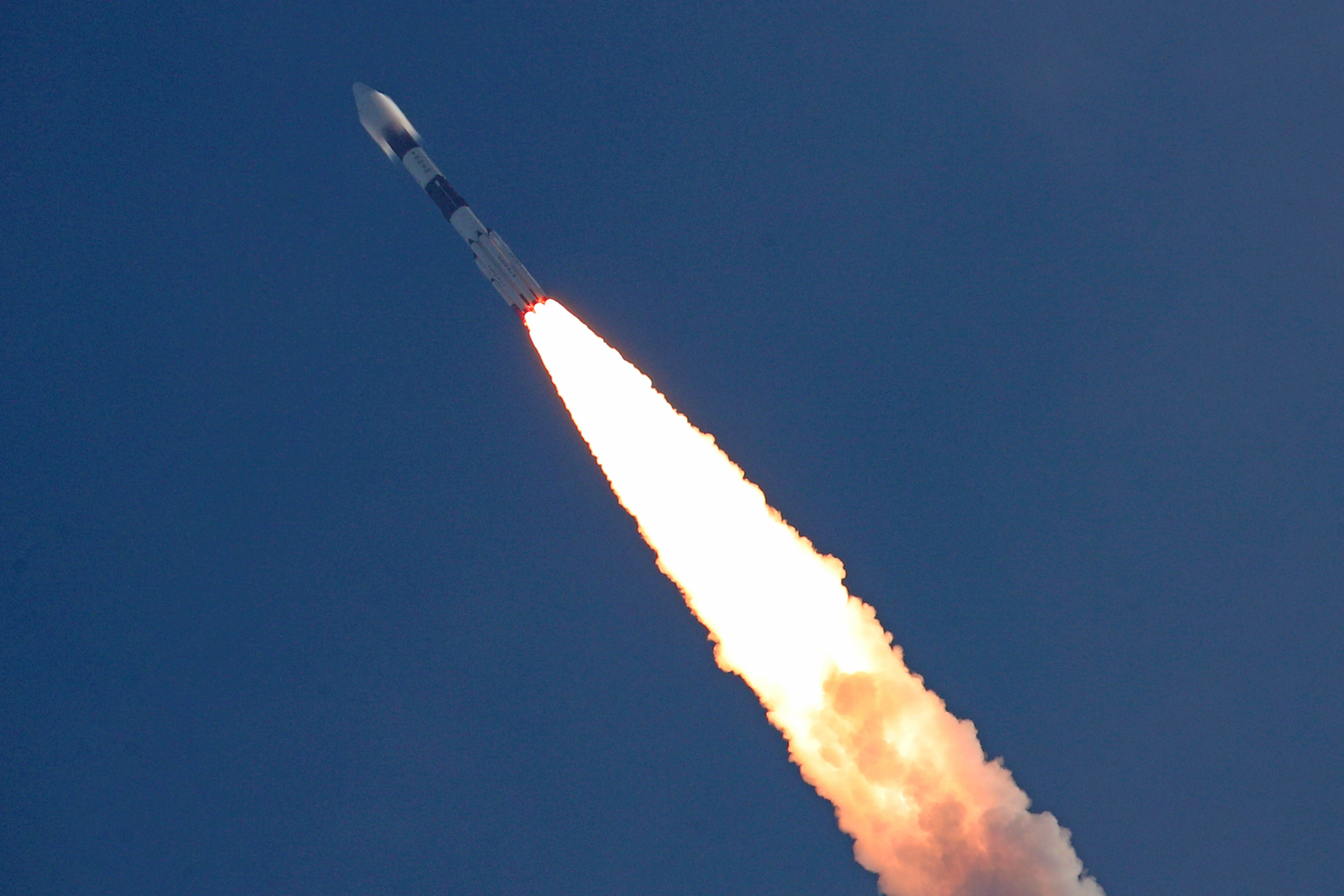
PSLV in flight

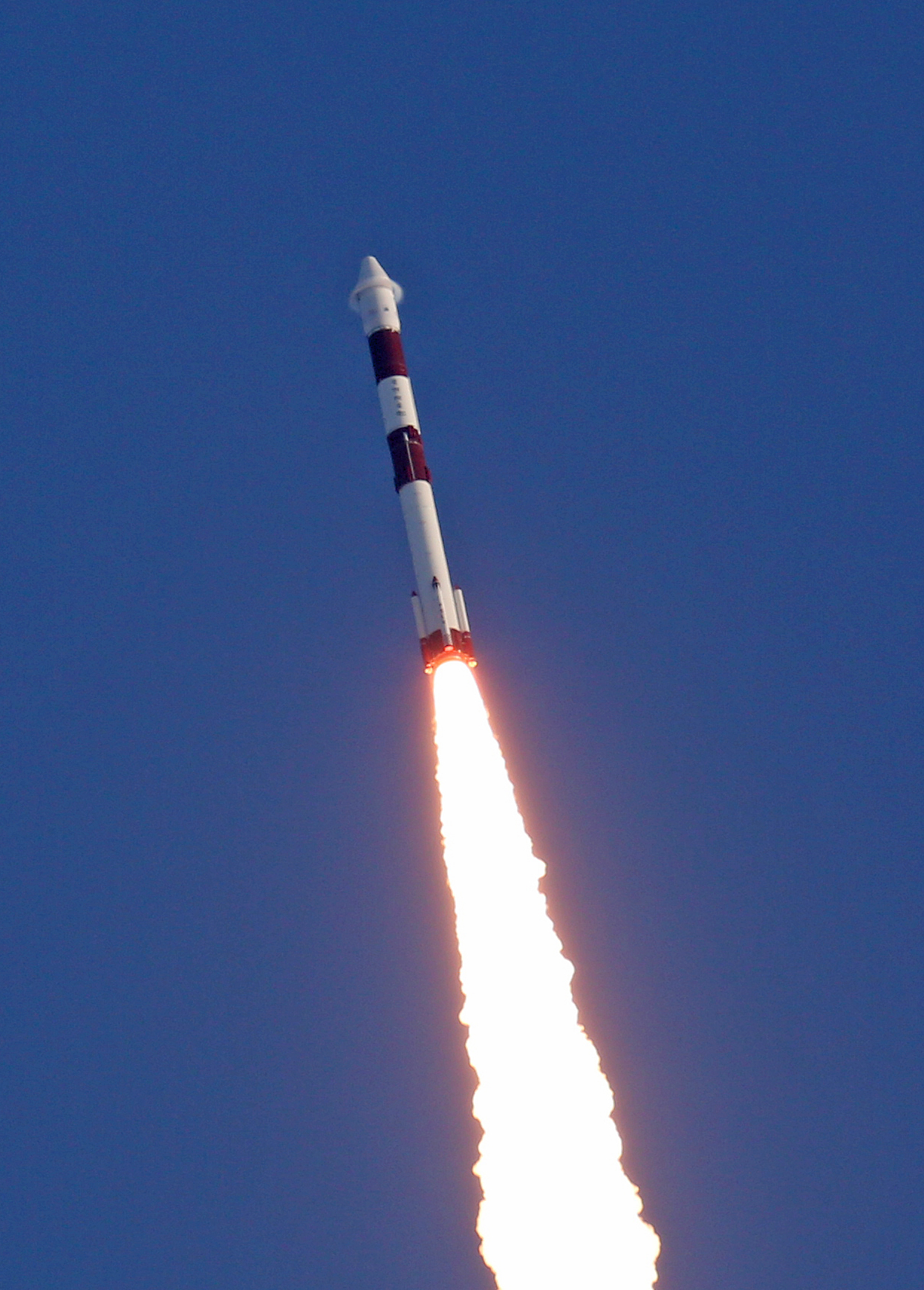
PSLV Mid-flight with a visible vapor cone or shock collar formed around payload fairing

== See also ==
- List of GSLV launches
- List of LVM3 launches
- List of SSLV launches
