= CUTE-1.7 + APD II =

Follow up to CUTE-1.7 + APD nanosatellite

- Names: CUTE-1.7 + APD 2
- Mission type: Technology
- Operator: Tokyo Institute of Technology
- COSPAR ID: 2008-021C
- SATCAT no.: 32785
- Website: https://lss.mes.titech.ac.jp/ssp/cute1.7/index_e.html
- Mission duration: Elasped: 18 years, 2 months and 16 days

Spacecraft properties
- Manufacturer: Tokyo Institute of Technology
- Launch mass: 3 kg (6.6 lb)
- Dimensions: 20 × 15 × 10 cm (7.9 × 5.9 × 3.9 in)

Start of mission
- Launch date: 28 April 2008, 03:53:51 UTC
- Rocket: PSLV-CA (PSLV-C9)
- Launch site: Satish Dhawan, FLP
- Contractor: Indian Space Research Organisation

Orbital parameters
- Reference system: Geocentric orbit
- Regime: Low Earth orbit
- Perigee altitude: 606 km (377 mi)
- Apogee altitude: 626 km (389 mi)
- Inclination: 97.67°
- Period: 96.89 minutes

CUTE-1.7 + APD II, or CUTE-1.7 + APD 2, or OSCAR 65 is a Japanese nanosatellite which was launched in 2008 as a follow-up to the CUTE-1.7 + APD satellite. It was built and is operated by the Tokyo Institute of Technology.

== Spacecraft ==
CUTE-1.7 + APD II used a similar design to its predecessor, however it was stretched in height meaning that it no longer complied with the CubeSat form factor which the original satellite was based on. It has dimensions of 20 × 15 × 10 cm (7.9 × 5.9 × 3.9 in), compared to 20 × 10 × 10 cm (7.9 × 3.9 × 3.9 in) for CUTE-1.7 + APD, which was a standard two-unit CubeSat. The onboard computer is a personal digital assistant developed by Hitachi. The Cute-1.7 + APD series were equipped with several COTS (Commercial Off-The-Shelf) devices including widely used PDAs (Personal Digital Assistants) as their OBC (On-Board Computer) and amateur radio transceivers as communication devices.

== Mission ==
The University of Toronto Institute for Aerospace Studies was contracted to launch CUTE-1.7 + APD II, subcontracting the launch to the Indian Space Research Organisation (ISRO) as part of the Nanosatellite Launch Service 4 (NLS-4) mission along with CanX-2, AAUSAT-II, Compass-1, Delfi-C3 and SEEDS-2. ISRO used a Polar Satellite Launch Vehicle, flight number C9, to launch NLS-4 - with the rocket flying in the Core Alone, or PSLV-CA, configuration. The rocket's primary payload was Cartosat-2A, with IMS-1, Rubin-8 and the University of Toronto's NLS-5 mission - consisting of the CanX-6 satellite - also flying aboard the launch vehicle as secondary payloads.

== Launch ==
The launch took place at 03:53:51 UTC on 28 April 2008, with the satellites being deployed from the launch vehicle shortly afterwards. As of 24 January 2015, CUTE-1.7 + APD II is in a 606 km (377 mi) of apogee and 626 km (389 mi) orbit inclined at inclination 97.67° to the equator. Although only designed for a two-month mission, it still remains operational and continues to transmit data to the ground station at the Tokyo Institute of Technology.
