= SEEDS-2 =

Japanese amateur CubeSat picosatellite

- Mission type: Technology Development; Sensor experiments
- Operator: Nihon University
- COSPAR ID: 2008-021J
- SATCAT no.: 32791

Spacecraft properties
- Spacecraft type: 1U CubeSat
- Launch mass: 1 kilogram (2.2 lb)

Start of mission
- Launch date: 28 April 2008, 03:53:51 UTC
- Rocket: PSLV C9
- Launch site: Satish Dhawan SLP
- Contractor: ISRO

Orbital parameters
- Reference system: Geocentric
- Regime: Low Earth

The Space Engineering EDucation Satellite 2 (SEEDS-2 or OSCAR 66) is a Japanese amateur CubeSat nanosatellite, built and operated by Nihon University. It was launched by the Indian Space Research Organisation, aboard a PSLV rocket, on 28 April 2008. It was built to replace the SEEDS satellite, which was lost in a launch failure on a Dnepr rocket in July 2006. It carries a number of sensors to investigate the environment of space, and its own status. It also contains a voice transmitter, intended to play back messages to amateur radio operators.

== History ==
SEEDS is a student-developed CubeSat programme of Nihon University's Department of Aerospace Engineering, College of Science and Technology, in Chiba. The project began in 2000, and the first SEEDS satellite was completed in 2004. That satellite had a CW transmitter, an FM transmitter, an FM receiver and a deployable monopole antenna, but the Dnepr rocket failed about 86 seconds after launch. The mission was reflown as SEEDS-2, which received the designation CO-66 (CubeSat-OSCAR 66).

SEEDS-2 follows the CubeSat standard, as a 10 cm cube of 1 kg or less. Its sensors include 3-axis geomagnetic sensors, 3-axis gyro sensors, temperature sensors, solar cell galvanometers and voltage sensors, with platinum resistance temperature sensors at 14 locations inside the spacecraft. It was deployed from an XPOD deployer, with the Space Flight Laboratory of the University of Toronto Institute for Aerospace Studies acting as launch broker. On the same PSLV launch were Cartosat-2A, IMS-1, CanX-6 (NTS), CanX-2, AAUSAT-2, CUTE-1.7+APD II, COMPASS-1 and Delfi-C3.

== See also ==
- AAUSAT-II
- COMPASS-1
- CUTE-1.7
- Delfi-C3
- List of CubeSats
