= Nanosatellite Launch System =

The Nanosatellite Launch System (NLS) is a series of satellite launch missions launched 2003–2010, coordinated by the Space Flight Laboratory (SFL) of the University of Toronto Institute for Aerospace Studies (UTIAS).

NLS has provided low-cost launch services for a number of nanosatellites.

== Missions ==
=== NLS 1 ===
- Launch date: 30 June 2003
- Launch vehicle: Rockot
- Launch site: Plesetsk Cosmodrome
- Participants: (Canada) CanX-1, (Denmark) AAUSAT-1, (Denmark) DTUsat

=== NLS 4 ===
- Launch date: 28 April 2008
- Launch vehicle: Polar Satellite Launch Vehicle (PSLV-C9)
- Launch site: Satish Dhawan Space Centre, Second Launch Pad
- Participants: (Canada) CanX-2, (Denmark) AAUSAT-II, (Germany) COMPASS-1, (Netherlands) Delfi-C^{3}, (Japan) CUTE-1.7+APD II and (Japan) SEEDS II

=== NLS 5 ===
- Launch date: 28 April 2008
- Launch vehicle: Polar Satellite Launch Vehicle (PSLV-C9)
- Launch site: Satish Dhawan Space Centre, Second Launch Pad
- Participants: (Canada) CanX-6/NTS

=== NLS 6 ===
- Launch date : July 12, 2010
- Launch vehicle: Polar Satellite Launch Vehicle (PSLV-C15)
- Launch site: Satish Dhawan Space Centre, First Launch Pad
- Participants: (Norway) AISSat-1, (Switzerland) TIsat-1

=== NLS 8 ===
- Launch date : 25 February 2013
- Launch vehicle: Polar Satellite Launch Vehicle (PSLV-C15)
- Launch site: Satish Dhawan Space Centre, First Launch Pad
- Participants: (Canada) Sapphire, (Canada) NEOSSat, (Austria) TUGSAT-1, (Austria) UniBRITE-1, (United Kingdom) STRaND-1, (Denmark) AAUSAT3
