= Cartosat-2A =

Indian Earth observation satellite, 2008–2025

- Names: CartoSat-2A
- Mission type: Earth observation
- Operator: NTRO
- COSPAR ID: 2008-021A
- SATCAT no.: 32783
- Website: https://www.isro.gov.in/
- Mission duration: Planned: 5 years Achieved: 17 years and 6 months

Spacecraft properties
- Spacecraft: Cartosat-2a
- Bus: IRS-2
- Manufacturer: ISRO
- Launch mass: 690 kg (1,520 lb)
- Dry mass: 626 kg (1,380 lb)
- Power: 900 watts

Start of mission
- Launch date: 28 April 2008, 03:54:00 UTC
- Rocket: Polar Satellite Launch Vehicle (PSLC-C9)
- Launch site: Satish Dhawan Space Centre, SLP
- Contractor: ISRO

End of mission
- Deactivated: October 2025

Orbital parameters
- Reference system: Geocentric orbit
- Regime: Sun-synchronous orbit
- Perigee altitude: 616 km (383 mi)
- Apogee altitude: 637 km (396 mi)
- Inclination: 98.0°
- Period: 97.3 minutes
Instruments
- PAN: Panchromatic Camera

Cartosat-2A was an Earth observation satellite in a Sun-synchronous orbit and the third of the Cartosat series of satellites. The satellite is the thirteenth satellite in the Indian Remote Sensing (IRS) satellite series to be built, launched by the Indian Space Research Organisation for Ministry of Home Affairs (India) and other strategic users.

== Launch ==
Cartosat-2A was launched by the Polar Satellite Launch Vehicle (PSLV-C9) on 28 April 2008, «t 03:54:00 UTC, along with the 87 kg Indian Mini Satellite (IMS-1) and eight nano research satellites belonging to research facilities. The CanX-2 and the CanX-6 of Canada, the AAUSAT-2 of Denmark, the Compass-1 and the Rubin-8 of Germany, the CUTE-1.7 of Japan, and the Delfi-C3 of the Netherlands. The satellite completed its mission ojectives and became derelict in 2025.

== Payload ==
The satellite carries a panchromatic (PAN) camera (0.5 to 0.8 microns) with a spatial resolution of 1 meter and swath of 9.6 km. Two CCD’s are provided, one main and one redundant. The camera is mounted on a highly agile platform capable of being steered across and along the track to provide spot imagery of the area of interest.

== See also ==
- Indian military satellites
- List of Indian satellites
