= Rubin-8 =

- Mission type: Technology
- Operator: OHB-System
- COSPAR ID: 2008-021K
- SATCAT no.: 32792

Spacecraft properties
- Launch mass: 7 kilograms (15 lb)

Start of mission
- Launch date: 28 April 2008, 03:53:51 UTC
- Rocket: PSLV C9
- Launch site: Satish Dhawan SLP

Orbital parameters
- Reference system: Geocentric
- Regime: Low Earth

RUBIN-8, also known as RUBIN-AIS (Automatic Identification System), is a German space experiment package, built by OHB-System, which was launched by the Indian Space Research Organisation, aboard a PSLV rocket, on 28 April 2008. Following launch, it remained bolted to the upper stage of the rocket in low Earth orbit, where it is used to conduct experiments regarding the relay of AIS data via the Orbcomm and Iridium communication satellite networks.

== See also ==
- AAUSAT-II
- COMPASS-1
- CUTE-1.7
- Delfi-C3
- SEEDS-2
