= Advanced Avionics Module =

Indian satellite

The Advanced Avionics Module (AAM) was an Indian technology-demonstration module developed by the Indian Space Research Organisation (ISRO) to test advanced avionics systems for launch vehicles. It was launched aboard PSLV-C8 on 23 April 2007 alongside the Italian satellite AGILE. The 185 kg module was mounted inside the Dual Launch Adapter beneath AGILE and tested systems including mission computers, navigation and telemetry. It re-entered Earth's atmosphere on 19 July 2022.

== Description ==
The Advanced Avionics Module or AAM was a module launched on board PSLV-C8 along with the Italian satellite AGILE on 23 April 2007. It was designed by ISRO to test advanced launch vehicle avionics systems like mission computers, navigation and telemetry systems. At lift-off, it weighed 185 kg. It was mounted inside the Dual Launch Adapter, on top of which the AGILE was mounted. The AAM reentered the Earth's atmosphere on 19 July 2022. The Advanced Avionics Module (AAM) was an experimental Indian space payload developed by ISRO to test next-generation launch vehicle avionics systems.

== Development ==
PSLV-C8 was the eleventh flight of the Polar Satellite Launch Vehicle and its first commercial launch. Because of the light payload and the low-inclination orbit, it flew in the core-alone configuration, designated PSLV-CA, without the six strap-on motors of the first stage, and with about 400 kg less propellant in the twin-engine fourth stage, which normally carries about 2.5 tonnes. The primary payload, the 352 kg Italian gamma-ray satellite AGILE, was placed in a 550 km circular orbit inclined at 2.5 degrees. The 185 kg AAM, which was intended for future use on Indian launch vehicles, was housed inside the Dual Launch Adapter below AGILE and remained attached to the fourth stage, which serves as the terminal stage of the PSLV for precision injection. NASA's catalogue describes it as a test satellite intended to monitor the performance of that stage. It is catalogued as 2007-013B (SATCAT 31136) and was initially in an orbit of about 531 by 549 km at an inclination of 2.5 degrees, with a period of 95.5 minutes.
