= PSLV-C42 =

44th mission of the Indian Polar Satellite Launch Vehicle program

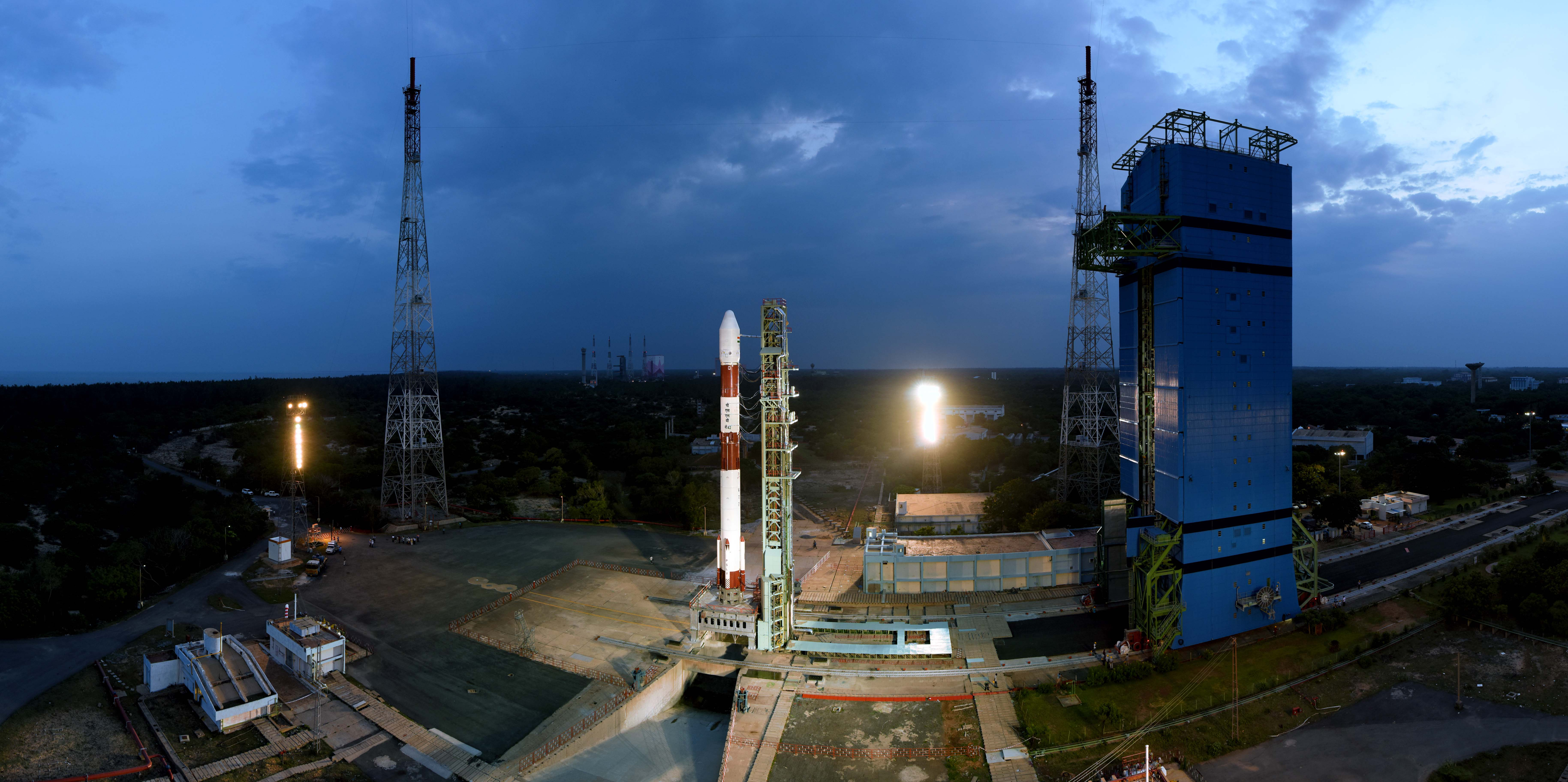
- The PSLV-CA launch vehicle rolled out at Sriharikota First, prior to flight C42

PSLV-CA launch
- Launch: 16 September 2018, 04:38:00 UTC
- Operator: ISRO
- Pad: Sriharikota First
- Payload: NovaSAR; S1-4
- Outcome: Success

PSLV launches

PSLV-C42 was the 44th mission of the Indian Polar Satellite Launch Vehicle (PSLV) program and its 12th mission in the Core Alone (CA) configuration. PSLV-C42 successfully carried and deployed 2 Earth observation satellites in Sun-synchronous orbits at an altitude of 588 kilometres (365 mi). It was launched on 16 September 2018 by the Indian Space Research Organisation (ISRO) from the first launch pad of the Satish Dhawan Space Centre at Sriharikota, Andhra Pradesh. The two international satellites were launched as part of a commercial arrangement between Surrey Satellite Technology Limited (SSTL) and ISRO's commercial arm Antrix Corporation Limited, run under the auspices of the Indian Government's Department of Space.

== Launch ==
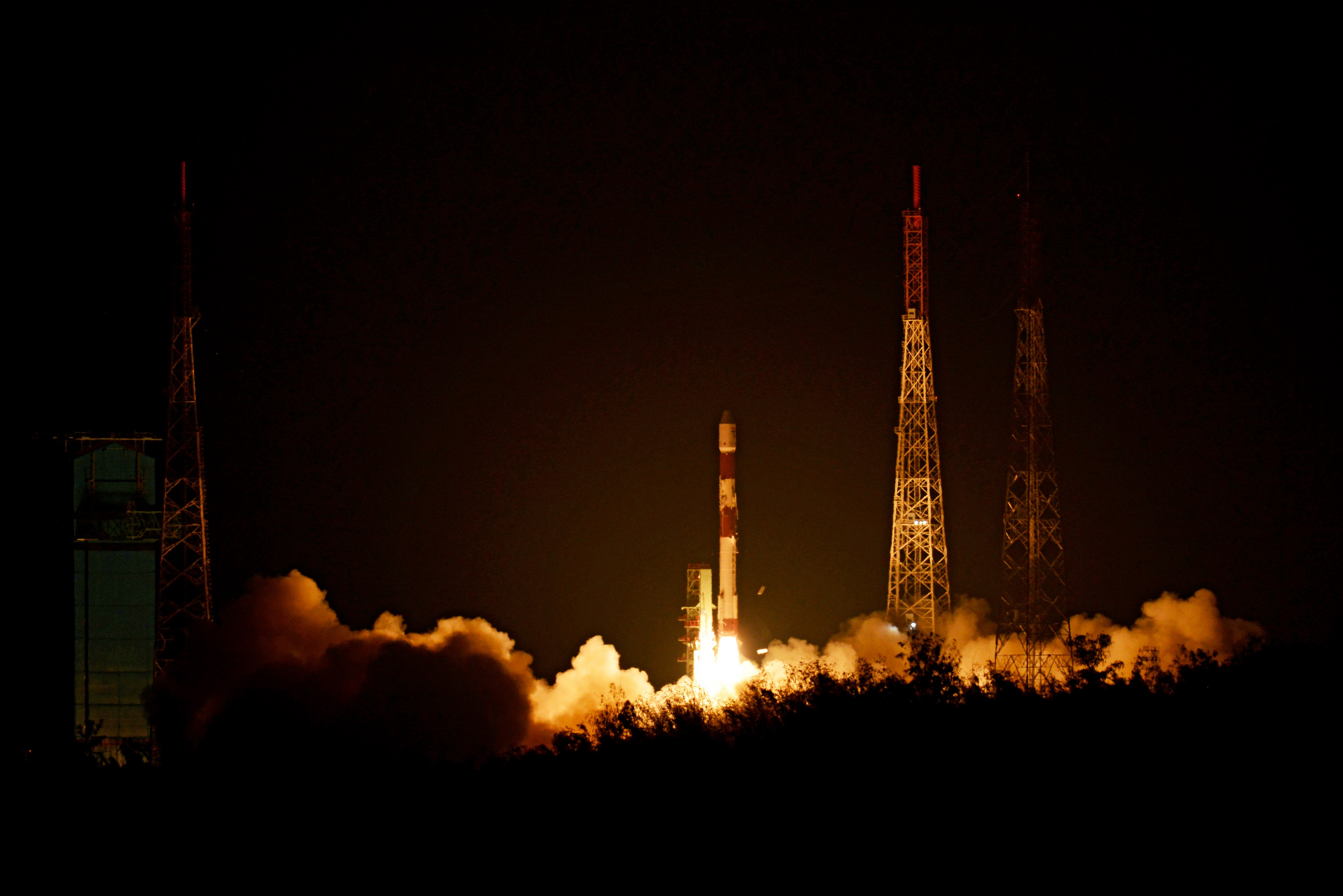
PSLV C42 lifting off from First Launch Pad carrying NovaSAR and S1-4 satellites built by SSTL on 16 September 2018

The PSLV-C42 was launched from the first launch pad of the Satish Dhawan Space Centre in Sriharikota at 10:08 p.m. IST on 16 September 2018, after a 33-hour countdown that began at 1:08 p.m. IST on 15 September 2018. The launch was the 44th flight of the PSLV rocket and the 12th in the Core Alone (CA) configuration. It was the first fully commercial launch of the PSLV rocket in 2018 after a five-month hiatus since its last launch on 12 April 2018, and only the third launch after a rare launch failure on 31 August 2017.

The PSLV-C42 carried two United Kingdom Earth observation satellites into Sun-synchronous orbit, namely NovaSAR and S1-4. Shortly after lift-off, the rocket commenced a short vertical ascent before heading in a south easterly direction. The first stage of the rocket separated nearly two minutes after the lift-off, immediately after which the second stage was ignited. About 3 minutes, 2 seconds following lift off, the payload fairing separated, and the second stage separated about 1 minutes and 21 seconds later.

This was immediately followed by the ignition of the third stage, which accelerated the rocket for about 3 minutes and 45 seconds until it separated at 8 minutes, 9 seconds after lift off. The fourth and final stage was then ignited approximately 10 seconds later, which continued powering the rocket until approximately 16 minutes and 57 seconds. Both satellites were subsequently placed in Sun-synchronous orbits 17.44 minutes after the launch at an altitude of 588 kilometres (365 mi). R. Hutton, mission director for the PSLV C-42 launch, said: "This was a spectacular mission. We have placed the satellite in a very, very precise orbit".

The PSLV-C42 launch was a night time mission and was carried out for the first time by ISRO upon the request by the Surrey Satellite Technology Limited (SSTL), whose satellites were launched, in order to achieve a specific orbit. "This unique mission is mainly for 'ascending daytime node' launch. This is the first time we have executed a different type of mission altogether," said Kailasavadivoo Sivan, chairman of ISRO. With this launch, the total number of foreign satellites launched by ISRO reached 239 from 28 different countries.

== Mission overview ==
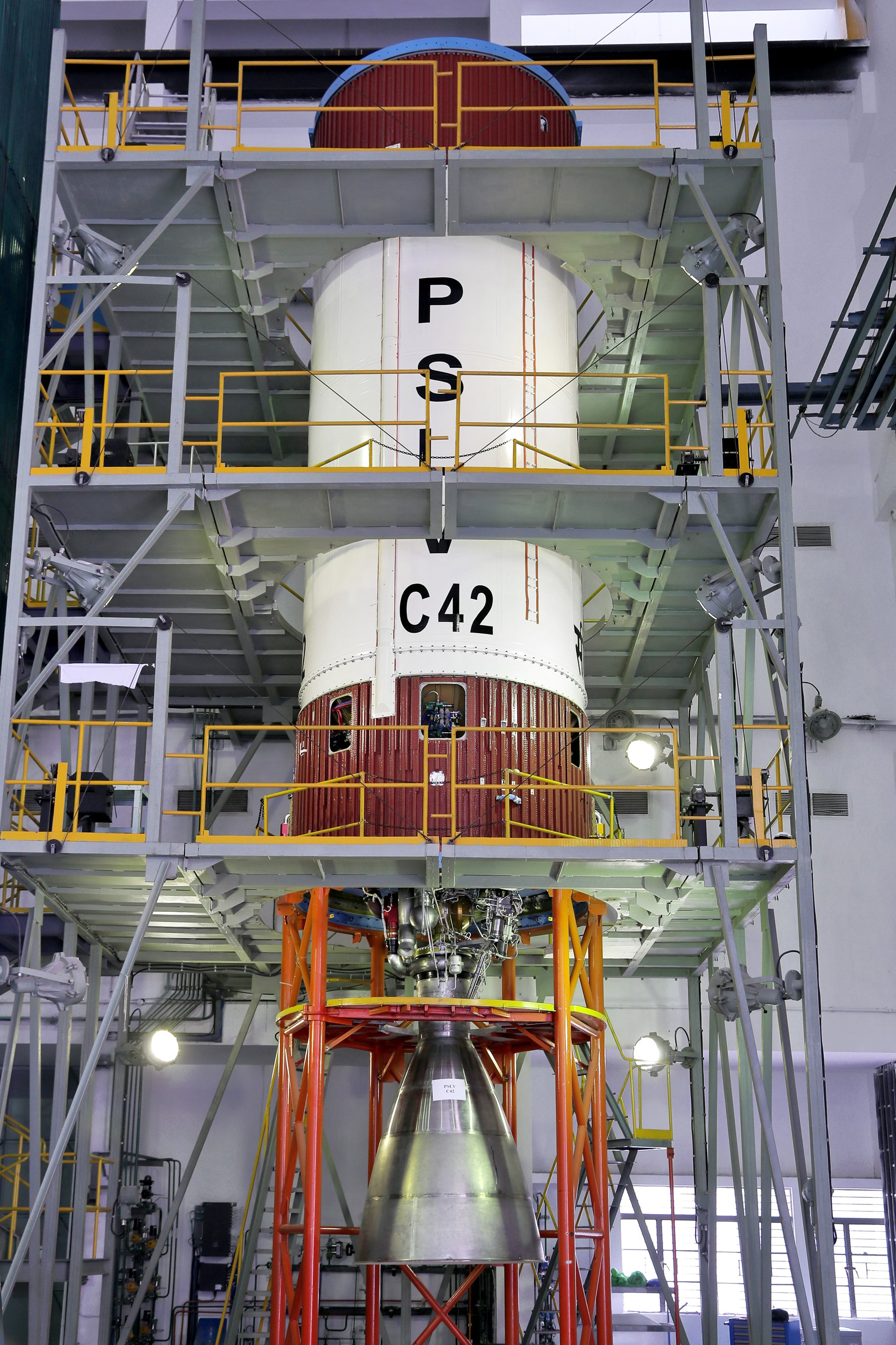
PSLV-C42 second liquid stage at stage preparation facility

- Mass:
  - Total liftoff weight: 230,400 kilograms (507,900 lb)
  - Payload weight: 889 kilograms (1,960 lb)
- Overall height: 44.4 metres (145.7 ft)
- Propellant:
  - Stage 1: Composite Solid
  - Stage 2: Earth Storable Liquid
  - Stage 3: Composite Solid
  - Stage 4: Earth Storable Liquid
- Propellant mass:
  - Stage 1: 138,200 kilograms (304,700 lb)
  - Stage 2: 42,000 kilograms (93,000 lb)
  - Stage 3: 7,600 kilograms (16,800 lb)
  - Stage 4: 2,500 kilograms (5,500 lb)
- Maximum vacuum thrust:
  - Stage 1: 4846.9 kN
  - Stage 2: 803.78 kN
  - Stage 3: 239.6 kN
  - Stage 4: 2 x 7.33 kN
- Altitude: 588 kilometres (365 mi)
- Maximum velocity: 7,566.69 metres per second (24,825 ft/s) (recorded at time of NovaSAR and S1-4 separation)
- Inclination: 97.806°
- Azimuth: 140°

The PSLV C-42 rocket had four stages; each one was self-contained, with its own propulsion system, thereby capable of functioning independently. The first and third stages used composite solid propellants, while the third and fourth stage used earth-storable liquid propellants. It had a lift-off mass of 230,400 kilograms (507,900 lb) and measured 44.4 metres (146 ft) in height. It carried two British satellites built by SSTL into orbit, weighing 445 kilograms (981 lb) and 444 kilograms (979 lb) respectively, bringing the total payload mass to 889 kilograms (1,960 lb).

The two satellites were placed in a Sun-synchronous orbit at 588 kilometres (365 mi) altitude and 97.806° inclination. Arrangements for the launch of the two satellites were made between ISRO's commercial arm Antrix Corporation Limited, under the auspices of the Indian Government's Department of Space, and SSTL. Antrix earned in excess of ₹220 crore (US$26 million) from this launch. "The PSLV-C42 marks the latest technology and commercial collaboration between India and the UK with the launch of the combination of high resolution optical and radar (SAR) satellites from us," said Martin Sweeting, group executive chairman of SSTL.

== Rocket ==
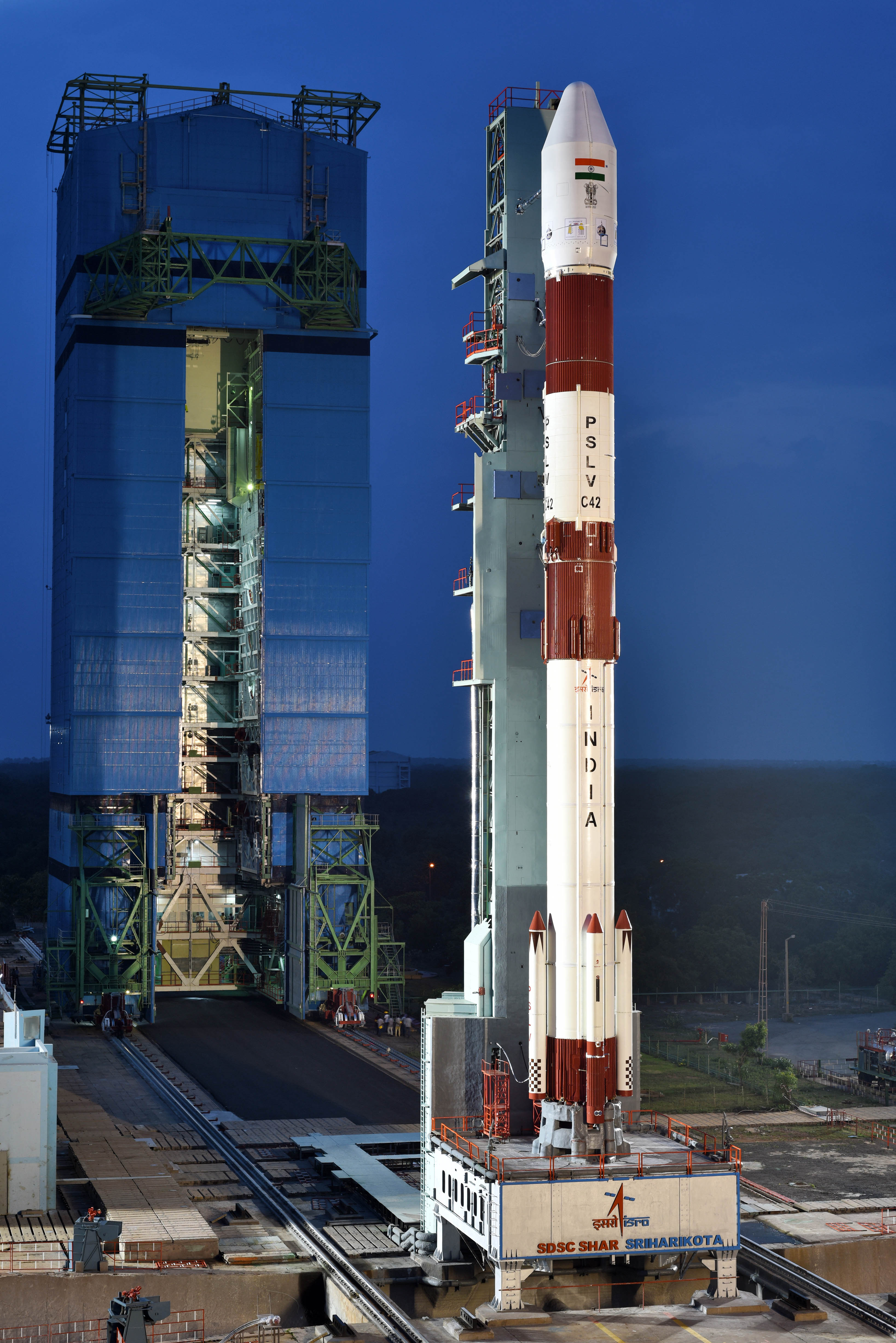
PSLV C-42 rocket

For this launch, the PSLV C-42 rocket was used in the CA configuration without the six strap-on motors. First flown in April 2007, it is the lightest version of the PSLV rocket, and is used for launching small payloads. Many centres of ISRO were involved in this mission: the rocket was designed and developed by the Vikram Sarabhai Space Centre (VSSC) at Thiruvananthapuram in India; the liquid engines for the second and fourth stages were developed by ISRO's Liquid Propulsion Systems Centre (LPSC) at Thiruvananthapuram and ISRO Propulsion Complex (IPRC) at Mahendragiri; the rocket's guidance system was developed by ISRO Inertial Systems Unit (IISU) at Thiruvananthapuram; while the Satish Dhawan Space Centre (SDSC), Sriharikota Range (SHAR) assumed the responsibility for solid motor preparation, vehicle integration and launch infrastructure. ISRO Telemetry, Tracking and Command Network provided tracking support for the mission. R Hutton, who is the project director of PSLV, was also the mission director for this launch.

== Satellites ==
NovaSAR is an S-band synthetic-aperture radar (SAR) satellite, designed and built in Guildford, United Kingdom by SSTL. It has a distinctive cheese grater shape, and is capable of taking pictures of earth's surface irrespective of weather conditions, day or night. It carries a S-band SAR payload, which was developed by Airbus Defence and Space in Portsmouth, England, and a receiver developed by Honeywell Aerospace capable of picking up Automatic identification system (AIS) radio signals. The major application areas of the satellite includes oil spills detection, forestry and flood monitoring, disaster response, crop assessment, ship detection and maritime surveillance. "NovaSAR-1 is the first SAR spacecraft to be manufactured entirely in the UK and is a technology demonstration mission designed to test the capabilities of a new low cost S-Band SAR platform. NovaSAR-1 will be the world’s first commercial SAR satellite to be operated at a 10:30 equator crossing time, providing time diversity for radar observations by affording increased daylight imaging opportunities in addition to night acquisitions," SSTL said in a press release.

S1-4 is a high resolution optical Earth observation satellite, built by SSTL. The satellite has a lifespan of more than seven years and carries a high-resolution imager designed by SSTL capable of operating in two modes: a panchromatic mode, in which it provides sub-one metre resolution images, and a multispectral mode, in which it provides sub-four metre resolution images with a swath width of about 24 km. Data collected by the satellite will be used by a Chinese company called Twenty First Century Aerospace Technology Company, Ltd (21 AT). The major application areas of the satellite includes urban planning, land classification, management of natural resources, agriculture and disaster monitoring.
