= Max Valier (satellite) =

X-ray space telescope

- COSPAR ID: 2017-036P
- SATCAT no.: 42778

Max Valier was a 15 kg (33 lb) X-ray telescopic satellite which was built in collaboration with the Technologische Fachoberschule "Max Valier" in Bozen, the Technologische Fachoberschule "Oskar von Miller" in Meran and the Amateurastronomen "Max Valier". The Max Planck Institute for Astrophysics provided the small X-ray telescope μRosi, which allowed amateur astronomers to observe the sky in X-ray wavelength for the first time. It was launched with the help of the OHB (OHB of Germany) by an Indian PSLV-C38 rocket on June 23, 2017. It re-entered the Earth's atmosphere on June 30, 2024 after remaining operative for 7 years and 7 days.
