= PSLV-C28 =

- Model of the PSLV rocket
- Mission type: Deployment of 5 satellites.
- Operator: ISRO & Antrix Corporation
- COSPAR ID: 2015-032C & 2015-032D
- SATCAT no.: 40717 & 40718
- Website: ISRO website
- Mission duration: 19 minutes & 21 seconds
- Distance travelled: 647 km

Spacecraft properties
- Spacecraft: Polar Satellite Launch Vehicle
- Spacecraft type: Launch vehicle
- Manufacturer: ISRO (Launch Vehicle) & Surrey Satellite (Satellites)
- Launch mass: 320,000 kilograms (710,000 lb)
- Payload mass: 1,440 kilograms (3,170 lb)

Start of mission
- Launch date: 21:58, July 10, 2015 (IST)
- Rocket: PSLV
- Launch site: Satish Dhawan Space Centre
- Contractor: ISRO
- Deployment date: 10 Jul 2015

End of mission
- Disposal: Placed in graveyard orbit
- Deactivated: 10 Jul 2015

Orbital parameters
- Regime: Sun-synchronous orbit

Payload
- Three DMC3 satellites, One CBNT-1 (technology demonstrator)&, One De-OrbitSail (TD nano satellite)

PSLV-C28 (a.k.a. DMC3 mission) was the 29th consecutive successful mission (overall 30th) of the PSLV program. The PSLV-C28 carried and successfully deployed 5 satellites in the Sun-synchronous orbit. With a launch mass of 320,000 kilograms (710,000 lb) and payload mass of payload mass 1,440 kilograms (3,170 lb), the C28 was the heaviest commercial mission undertaken by the Indian Space Research Organisation and Antrix Corporation. The PSLV-C28 carried three identical optical Earth observation satellites (DMC3-1, DMC3-2 & DMC3-3), an optical Earth observation technology demonstrator microsatellite (CBNT-1), and an experimental nanosatellite (De-orbitSail). All the satellites were built by Surrey Satellite Technology (SSTL). Although built by SSTL, the "De-orbitSail" belonged to the Surrey Space Centre.

== See also ==
- Indian Space Research Organisation
- Polar Satellite Launch Vehicle
