= PEGASUS =

PEGASUS is an encryption algorithm used for satellite telemetry, command link and mission data transfers.

According to a budget item justification document for FY 2004–2005, this cryptographic algorithm is used for Global Positioning Systems (GPS), Space-Based Infrared Systems (SBIRS), MILSATCOM, and other Special Project Systems.
