= Compass-1 =

German remote sensing cubesat

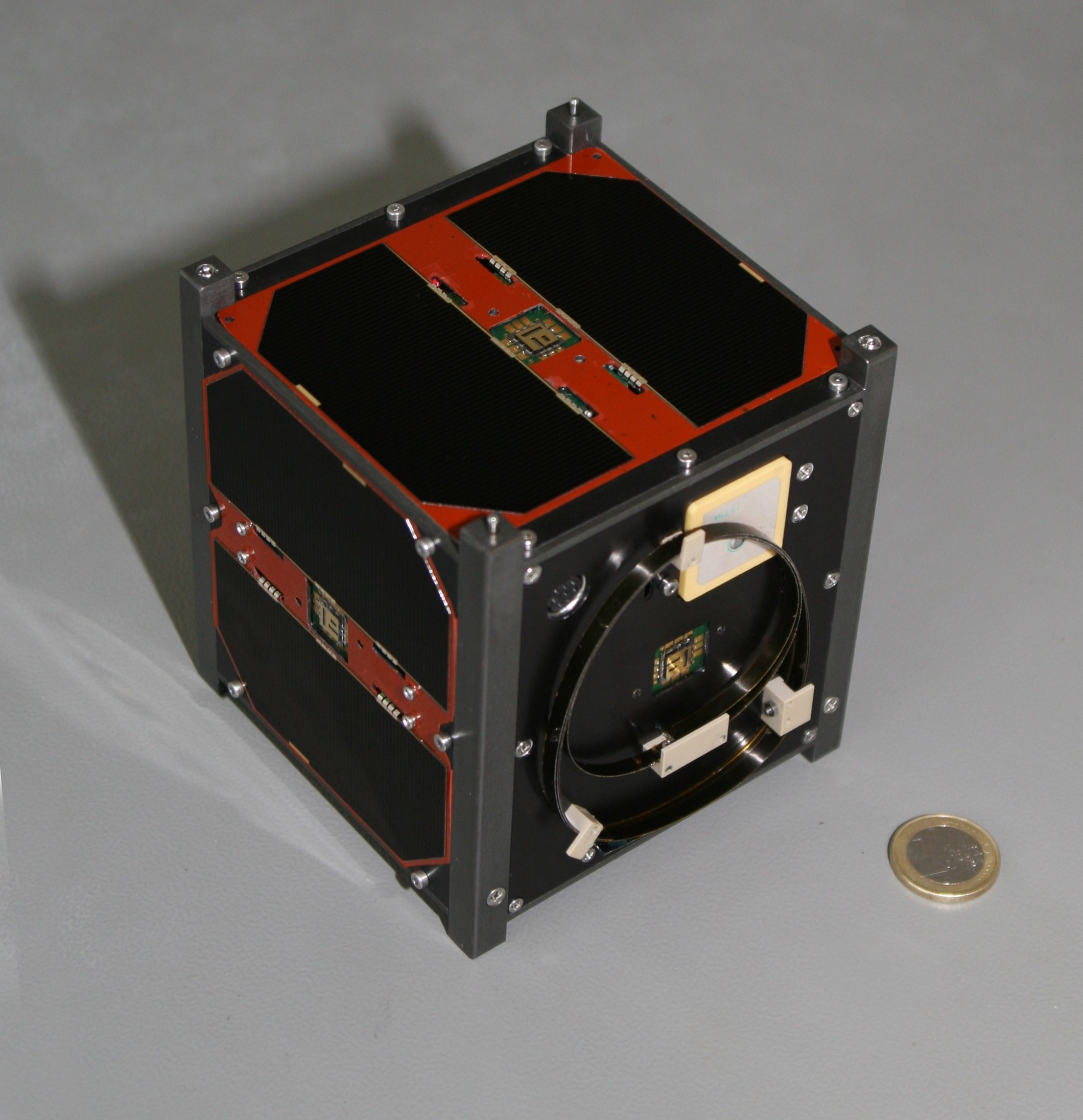
- Mission type: Remote Sensing/Imaging technology
- Operator: Fachhochschule Aachen
- COSPAR ID: 2008-021E
- SATCAT no.: 2008-021E
- Website: http://www.raumfahrt.fh-aachen.de/compass-1/home.htm
- Mission duration: Achieved: 10 years, 9 months and 1 day

Spacecraft properties
- Spacecraft type: 1U CubeSat
- Manufacturer: Aachen University of Applied Science
- Launch mass: < 1 kilogram (2.2 lb)
- Dry mass: 850 Grams
- Power: 1 watt provided by 10 High-efficient Gallium-Arsenide Triple-Junction solar panels

Start of mission
- Launch date: 28 April 2008, 03:53:51 UTC
- Rocket: PSLV-C9
- Launch site: Satish Dhawan Space Centre Second Launch Pad
- Contractor: ISRO

End of mission
- Last contact: March 3, 2012
- Decay date: January 30, 2019

Orbital parameters
- Reference system: Geocentric
- Regime: Low Earth
- Perigee altitude: 582 km
- Apogee altitude: 597 km
- Inclination: 97.5636°
- Period: 97.4 Minutes

Compass-1 (also known as Compass One) is a German amateur CubeSat picosatellite, built and operated in the late 2000s by Aachen University of Applied Science. It was launched by the Indian Space Research Organisation, aboard a PSLV rocket as a secondary payload to the CartoSat-2A primary spacecraft on 28 April 2008. It was launched into a Geocentric orbit with an altitude of 597 km. Its primary mission is remote sensing; however, it also contains some technology demonstration experiments regarding the use of small satellites and GPS tracking.

On 10 August 2008, the satellite developed a problem and switched into "emergency mode". Initial attempts to rectify this problem failed; however, normal operations were resumed on 10 September, with help from amateur radio operators around the world.

== Overview ==
Most of the objectives for Compass-1 were focused on the evaluation and testing of CubeSats and new technologies. It was made using scratch-built software, hardware, and parts, except the solar panels. Thus it inherited a high risk for mission failure.

=== Mission Objectives ===
Mission objectives include:

-Take color pictures in 640 by 480 resolution

-Validate a Phoenix GPS receiver

-Test a Magnetic Actuator based 3-axis gyroscope

== Mission Anomalies ==
There have been events that have been solved but remain to be explained, as Compass-1 has entered emergency mode and has undergone full resets a number of times.

=== Emergency Mode ===
==== August 10, 2008 ====
On August 10, 2008, Compass-1 entered Emergency mode. The cause was unknown and FH Aachen put out a call to all amateur radio operators to try to find out what was going on with the CubeSat. A hard reset occurred, only to bring the satellite into a circle of powering up, turning on the heaters, and then dying again. The only way to exit this loop was to avoid starting the heaters. The team needed as much Telemetry from the ground as possible, which was from amateur radio enthusiasts.

==== September 10, 2008 ====
After multiple tries, the Compass-1 team finally got enough charge retained in the batteries to boot the CubeSat and get a beacon and images back from the probe. It was later determined that there was a major software flaw that prevented the heaters from letting the battery charge.

=== Hard Resets ===
There have been multiple hard resets, with the most recent one being on February 8, 2009.

== End of life ==
Compass-1 was retired on March 3, 2012. It still can be used as a beacon until it burns up or the batteries can no longer hold charge. It is expected to stay in orbit until 2019.

== See also ==
- CUTE-1.7
- Delfi-C3
- AAUSAT-II
- List of CubeSats
- COMPASS-2
