= IMS-1 =

Indian earth observation satellite

- Mission type: Earth observation
- Operator: ISRO
- COSPAR ID: 2008-021D
- SATCAT no.: 32786
- Mission duration: 2 years

Spacecraft properties
- Launch mass: 83 kilograms (183 lb)
- Power: 220 watts

Start of mission
- Launch date: 28 April 2008, 03:53 UTC
- Rocket: PSLV C9
- Launch site: Satish Dhawan SLP

Orbital parameters
- Reference system: Geocentric
- Regime: Low Earth
- Perigee altitude: 630 kilometres (390 mi)
- Apogee altitude: 630 kilometres (390 mi)
- Inclination: degrees
- Period: ~90 minutes (estimated)
- Epoch: 27 April 2008, 23:54:00 UTC

IMS-1 is an Earth observation satellite in a Sun-synchronous orbit. The satellite which is the fourteenth satellite in the Indian Remote Sensing (IRS) satellite series has been built, launched and maintained by the Indian Space Research Organisation (ISRO). IMS-1 is the first satellite to use ISRO's Indian Mini Satellite bus.

It was launched by the Polar Satellite Launch Vehicle - C9 on April 28, 2008 along with the Cartosat-2A and eight nano research satellites belonging to research facilities in Canada, Denmark, Germany, Japan and the Netherlands.

== See also ==
- Indian Remote Sensing satellite
- List of Indian satellites
