= Canadian Advanced Nanospace eXperiment Program =

Canadian CubeSat nanosatellite program

The Canadian Advanced Nanospace eXperiment (CanX) program is a Canadian CubeSat nanosatellite program operated by the University of Toronto Institute for Aerospace Studies, Space Flight Laboratory (UTIAS/SFL). The program's objectives are to involve graduate students in the process of spaceflight development, and to provide low-cost access to space for scientific research and the testing of nanoscale devices. The CanX projects include CanX-1, CanX-2, the BRIght Target Explorer (BRITE), and CanX-4&5.

== The CanX Program ==
The Canadian Advanced Nanospace eXperiment (CanX) program is the first Canadian nanosatellite program, and the only one of its kind at present. It is operated by teachers and graduate students at the University of Toronto Institute for Aerospace Studies, Space Flight Laboratory (UTIAS/SFL). The program was established in 2001 by Dr. Robert E. Zee, manager of UTIAS/SFL, and is based on the CubeSat program started by Stanford University and California Polytechnic State University. Its projects include CanX-1, CanX-2, CanX-3 (BRITE), and CanX-4&5.

The program's objectives are to involve graduate students in the process of spacecraft development, and to provide relatively low cost access to space for scientific research and the testing of nanoscale devices in orbital space. In March 2009 CanX-2 completed its first year in orbit.

== CanX-1 ==
The Canadian Advanced Nanospace eXperiment 1 (CanX-1, COSPAR 2003-031H) is Canada's first nanosatellite and a one unit CubeSat; it has a mass of under 1 kg, fits in a 10 cm cube, and operates on less than 2 watts.

CanX-1 was completed in 22 months and was launched, along with the Microvariability and Oscillations of STars telescope, on June 30, 2003 at 14:15 UTC by Eurockot Launch Services from Plesetsk, Russia. It lost contact with Earth after launch.

=== Operation modes ===
The operation modes of CanX-1 are:

- Safe-Hold/Sleep
- Detumbling/Torquing
- Payload Active

In each mode, the OBC is always collecting telemetry data from the temperature, voltage, and current sensors present on every solar panel and interior circuit board.^{2}

==== Safe-Hold ====
In Safe-Hold mode, the OBC maintains minimum power and the radio is in receive mode. If there is sufficient power available, the radio will transmit a beacon pulse just under once per minute. All payloads, magnetorquers and the magnetometer are switched off. CanX-1 switches into safe-hold mode in any emergency situation, and it stays in this mode until instructed to resume normal operations after any required fixes are implemented. It can also be placed in safe-hold mode by the ground operator whenever it is not performing any missions or experiment for a long period of time.

==== Detumbling/Torquing ====
CanX-1 only switches into the detumbling/torquing mode when it is instructed to do so. It is for reducing the tumbling rate of the nanosatellite so that any images taken are not blurred as a result of CanX-1's motion. This mode can also be used to increase the tumbling rate of CanX-1 so that images can be taken in multiple directions without long delays. It uses maximum power when all three magnetorquers and the magnetometer are on simultaneously, and all payloads are switched off because sufficient power may not be available.

==== Payload Active ====
Payload Active is the normal operation mode of CanX-1. The picosatellite switches to this mode whenever it is instructed to do so. While in payload active mode all payloads are switched on, and CanX-1 transmits a beacon pulse every minute until it is instructed to send all collected telemetry and images to the ground operators.

=== Payloads and experimental subsystems ===
The CanX-1 mission was intended to demonstrate a highly capable spacecraft, and it incorporates a number of payloads and experimental subsystems.^{1} These include:

1. Agilent CMOS Imagers
2. Active Magnetic Attitude Control System (ACS)
3. GPS Receiver
4. ARM7-based On-Board Computer (OBC)

==== CMOS Imagers ====
The imager payload aboard CanX-1 consists of two Agilent CMOS imagers. The color imager in conjunction with a wide-angle lens was intended primarily for taking photographs of Earth, and the monochrome imager in conjunction with a narrow-angle lens was for testing the feasibility of taking star, moon, and horizon pictures which could then be used for attitude determination and control.

==== Active Magnetic Attitude Control System ====
CanX-1 had a COTS magnetometer along with three custom-built magnetorquer coil systems as part of the active magnetic attitude control system (ACS). The magnetic ACS is for detumbling the satellite to assure that any images taken by CanX-1 are not blurred due to the rotation of the picosatellite. Also, CanX-1 was scheduled to perform active coarse pointing.

==== GPS Receiver ====
A commercial-off-the-shelf (COTS) GPS receiver was also aboard CanX-1. Connected to two antennas for omni-directional coverage, the picosatellite was meant to test the functionality of the GPS receiver in space in order to determine whether the receiver could be used to help determine the orbital position of CanX-1.

==== ARMS7-based On-Board Computer ====
CanX-1 was launched with a custom designed On-Board Computer (OBC) based on the low-power ARM7 core, which operates on up to 40 MHz. The functionality of this OBC was to be monitored throughout the entire lifetime of CanX-1.

== CanX-2 ==
The mission of the CanX-2 nanosatellite, weighing 3.5 kilograms, is to evaluate new technologies that will be used on the CanX-4/CanX-5 dual satellite mission in 2009 to demonstrate controlled formation flying in space. It is hoped that this formation flying technology will allow larger missions for high resolution Earth observation and interferometric imaging that can also be used for space astronomy. The technologies to be tested on the CanX-2 nanosatellite included:

1. A new propulsion system
2. Custom radios
3. Attitude sensors and actuators
4. A commercial GPS receiver
5. A nadir-pointed infrared spectrometer for pollution monitoring (Argus)

In addition to evaluating these technologies, the satellite will also perform experiments for other university researchers across Canada. These experiments include a GPS radio occultation experiment to characterize the upper atmosphere, an atmospheric spectrometer to measure greenhouse gases (Argus) developed by York University, and a network communications experiment. It will also carry out several space materials experiments.

CanX-2 was launched on 28 April 2008 from the Satish Dhawan Space Centre (SHAR) as part of the NLS-4 group of satellites, aboard the Polar Satellite Launch Vehicle (PSLV) C-9.

According to the manufacturer of the reaction wheel used on CanX-2, "The wheel has been turned on and spun [and] is performing properly on orbit."

== CanX-3 ==
CanX-3, also known as the BRIght Target Explorer (BRITE), is a nanosatellite planned to make photometric observations of some of the brightest stars in the sky in order to examine them for variability. These observations should be about ten times more precise than any ground-based observations.

The satellites are 20 cm cube which uses a number of technologies qualified on CanX-2.

A preliminary design for BRITE has been completed with the support of ETech, and the components to be integrated into the nanosatellite are currently being evaluated at UTIAS/SFL.

== CanX-4 & 5 ==
CanX-4 & 5 are a two satellite pair that will be utilized to demonstrate formation flying using nanosatellite scale technology. These two satellites will be launched together, commissioned together, and then separated in orbit. Formations that will be examined include: a circulation of one space craft by the other (termed a projected circular orbit), an orbit where one satellite trails the other (termed an along track orbit), and a maneuver to move from the projected circular to along track formation.

The CanX-4 & 5 launch took place on 30 June 2014 on the Indian Polar Satellite Launch Vehicle (PSLV). The dual spacecraft mission were the first nanosattelites to demonstrate autonomous formation flights with centimetre-level positional control.

== CanX-6 ==
CanX-6 was a follow-up nanosattelite demonstration for the University of Toronto and Institute for Aerospace Studies. CanX-6 was started in October 2007, and was developed to demonstrate key aspects of the COM DEV spaceborne Automatic Identification System.

== CanX-7 ==
CanX-7 (COSPAR 2016-059F, SATCAT 41788) was launched 26 September 2016 and decayed from orbit 21 April 2022.

== See also ==
- Nanosatellite Launch System
