= CUTE-1.7 + APD =

Amateur radio satellite launched in 2006

- Names: Cubical Tech Engineering-1.7 + Avalanche Photodiode; CO-56 (OSCAR 56)
- Mission type: Technology
- Operator: Tokyo Institute of Technology
- COSPAR ID: 2006-005C
- SATCAT no.: 28941
- Mission duration: 0.2 years (achieved)

Spacecraft properties
- Bus: 2U CubeSat
- Manufacturer: Tokyo Institute of Technology
- Launch mass: 3 kg (6.6 lb)
- Dimensions: 20 × 10 × 10 cm (7.9 × 3.9 × 3.9 in)

Start of mission
- Launch date: 21 February 2006, 21:28:00 UTC
- Rocket: M-V # 8
- Launch site: Uchinoura
- Contractor: IHI AEROSPACE

End of mission
- Last contact: 16 March 2006
- Decay date: 25 October 2009

Orbital parameters
- Reference system: Geocentric orbit
- Regime: Low Earth orbit
- Perigee altitude: 299 km (186 mi)
- Apogee altitude: 712 km (442 mi)
- Inclination: 98.19°
- Period: 94.72 minutes

CUTE-1.7 + APD (Cubical Tokyo Tech Engineering satellite 1.7 plus Avalanche Photodiode) or CO-56 (Cubesat-Oscar-56) or just OSCAR 56 was an amateur radio satellite in the form of a double CubeSat. The satellite used commercial off-the-shelf components extensively, in particular, it used the Hitachi NPD-20JWL PDA as a control computer, and it used a USB hub for sensor communications. At the end of its mission, the satellite was supposed to deploy an electrodynamic tether to help it deorbit. The satellite failed early into its mission, so the electrodynamic tether experiment probably did not happen. It was launched on February 21, 2006 on board a Japanese launcher M-V.

On 16 March 2006, the communication system malfunctioned so that it was transmitting unmodulated carrier wave and unable to communicate. The satellite decayed from orbit on 25 October 2009. A follow-up mission, CUTE-1.7 + APD II, was launched in April 2008 and remains operational.

== See also ==
- List of CubeSats
