= Delfi-C3 =

Dutch mini-satellite

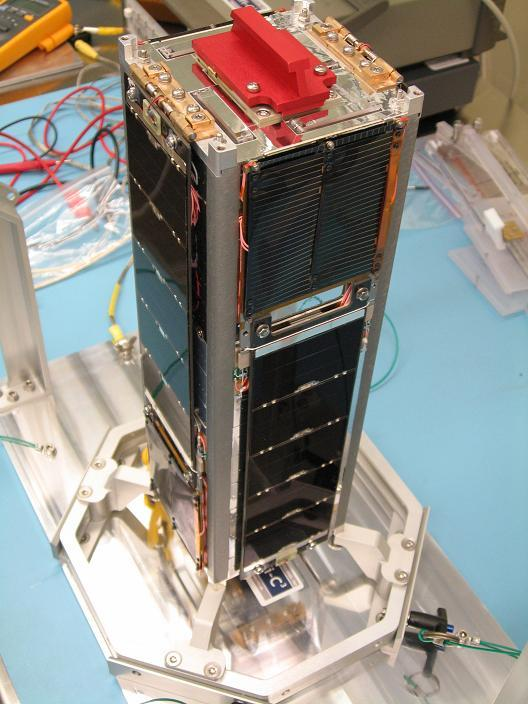
- Delfi-C^{3} in stowed configuration
- Mission type: Technology
- Operator: Delft University of Technology
- COSPAR ID: 2008-021G
- SATCAT no.: 32789
- Website: Delfi-C^{3} - Home
- Mission duration: 15 years, 6 months and 16 days (achieved)

Spacecraft properties
- Bus: 3U CubeSat
- Launch mass: 2.2 kilograms (4.9 lb)
- Power: 2.5 watts

Start of mission
- Launch date: 28 April 2008
- Rocket: PSLV-CA C9
- Launch site: Satish Dhawan SLP

End of mission
- Decay date: 13 November 2023

Orbital parameters
- Reference system: Geocentric
- Regime: Low Earth

Delfi-C^{3} is a CubeSat satellite constructed by students at the Delft University of Technology in the Netherlands. It is a 3-unit CubeSat, and was launched at 03:53:42 on 28 April 2008, as part of the NLS-4 mission, aboard a PSLV rocket, from the Second Launch Pad at the Satish Dhawan Space Centre in India. The launch was contracted by ISRO, through Antrix Corporation and UTIAS.

The satellite's primary mission is technology demonstration and development. It is carrying new types of solar cells, a solar sensor for TNO Science and Industry, and a high-efficiency amateur radio transceiver experiment.

Delfi-C^{3} does not contain batteries, as the experiments are dependent on the sun. She is the fourth Dutch Satellite, after ANS, IRAS and SLOSHSAT. It is the first Dutch university Satellite and is based on a 3-Unit CubeSat.

Some other mission characteristics include:

- No active attitude control;
- 1200Bd BPSK VHF downlink;
- Linear transponder.

The Delfi-C^{3} ground segment consists of two command ground stations, the primary being in Delft and the backup station at the TU Eindhoven in Eindhoven. For data collection, a distributed ground station network (DGSN) is used in which radio amateurs receive packets and sent these via internet to the central data collection server. Data decoding is possible with the free RASCAL software provided by the Delfi-C3 team.

The Delfi-C was still largely operational when it was followed up by the Delfi-n3Xt on October 21, 2013.

In May 2008, the amateur radio payload on the satellite was designated Delfi-C3 OSCAR-64 or Dutch OSCAR-64 (DO-64).

The cubesat decayed from orbit on 13 November 2023.

== See also ==
- List of CubeSats
