= AAUSat-2 =

CubeSat built and operated by Aalborg University, Denmark

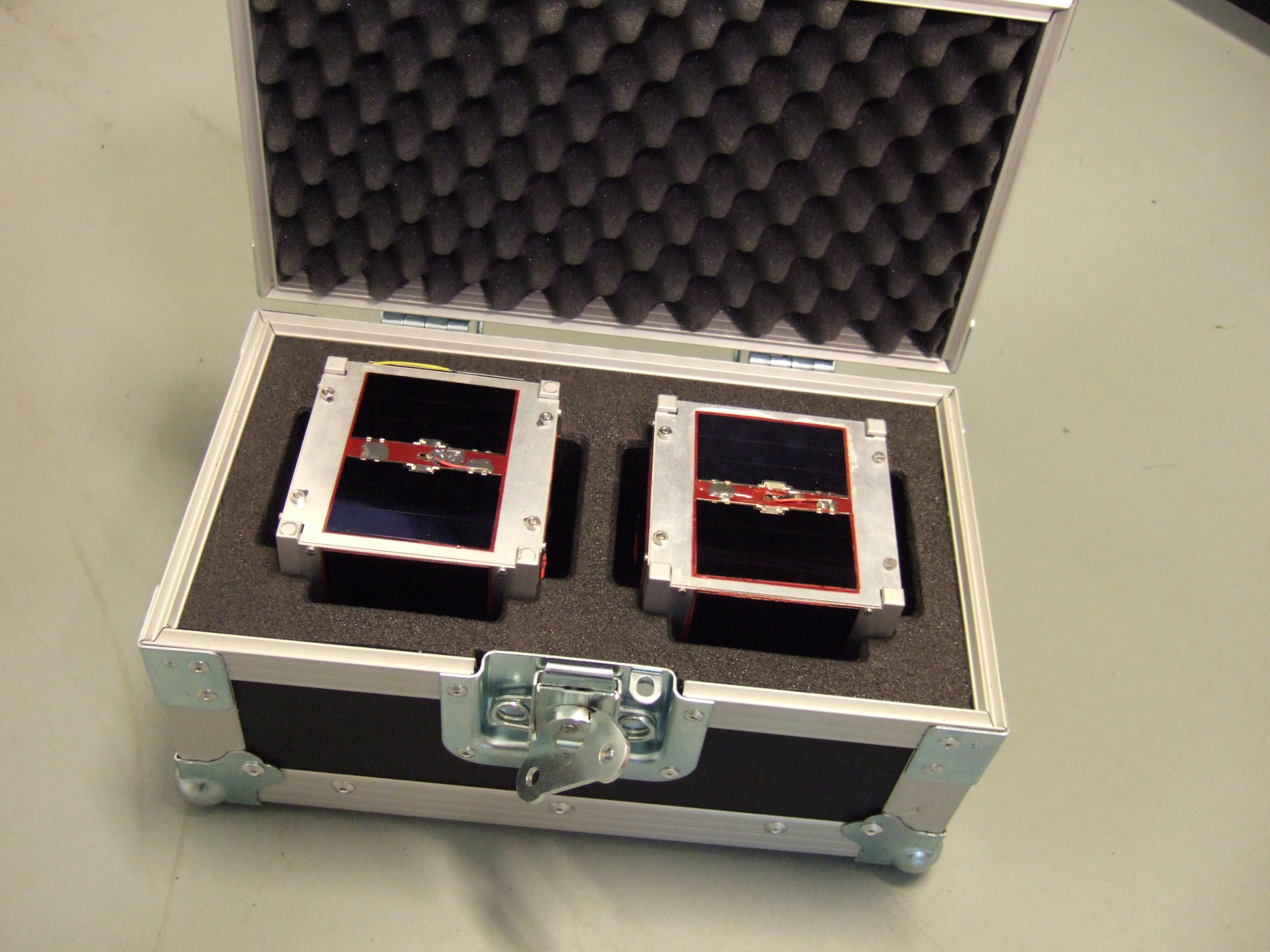
- AAUSAT-II, alongside its engineering model, ahead of launch
- Names: AAUSat-II; Aalborg University CubeSat-2
- Mission type: Technology demonstration
- Operator: AAU Student Space
- COSPAR ID: 2008-021F
- SATCAT no.: 32788
- Website: www.aausatii.aau.dk
- Mission duration: 6 months (planned); 4 years (primary) 15 years (ongoing)

Spacecraft properties
- Spacecraft: Aalborg University CubeSat-2
- Spacecraft type: 1U CubeSat
- Bus: CubeSat
- Manufacturer: AAU Student Space
- Launch mass: 1 kg (2.2 lb)
- Dimensions: 10 × 10 × 11.3 cm (3.9 × 3.9 × 4.4 in)

Start of mission
- Launch date: 28 April 2008, 03:53:51 UTC
- Rocket: Polar Satellite Launch Vehicle (PSLV-CA)
- Launch site: Satish Dhawan Space Centre, Second Launch Pad
- Contractor: Indian Space Research Organisation
- Entered service: May 2008

End of mission
- Disposal: Primary mission end
- Deactivated: March 2012

Orbital parameters
- Reference system: Geocentric orbit
- Regime: Sun-synchronous orbit
- Perigee altitude: 615 km (382 mi)
- Apogee altitude: 634 km (394 mi)
- Inclination: 97.9°
- Period: 97.4 minutes

Instruments
- Attitude Determination and Control System (ADCS); Gamma ray detector

AAUSAT-II (Aalborg University CubeSat no 2) is the second student-built CubeSat built and operated by students from Aalborg University in Denmark. It was launched 28 April 2008 05:53:51 UTC from Satish Dhawan Space Centre in India on a Polar Satellite Launch Vehicle (PSLV) launch vehicle. AAUSAT-II carries a gamma radiation sensor.

== Educational objective ==
The primary purpose of the construction of satellites at the University of Aalborg is to give the students engineering capabilities beyond what is normally achieved within a masters program.

== History ==
Student satellite activities at Aalborg University (AAU) started in 2003 as a result of AAU's involvement in the first pure Danish research satellite, Ørsted, which was successfully launched in 1999. AAUSAT-II's predecessor was AAU CubeSat which was constructed in the period 2001-2003 and was launched 30 June 2003. The project started in the summer 2003. The construction of AAUSAT-II began in 2005.

== Operations ==
After the launch on 28 April 2008, AAUSat-2 beacon was received at Cal Poly University in California but two-way amateur radio communications could not be achieved as it turned out that AAUSat-2 was transmitting at a lower level than anticipated. After upgrades to the ground station were completed, fully functional two-way communication were achieved and continued with normal operations until May 2009 after a year of successful operation.

The ground station has remained in operation and beacons are received on a regular basis, and AAUSat-2 is still considered operational, although heavy tumbling is observed (December 2009). Beacons were still received on a regular basis as of March 2011. In addition, AAUSat-2 does receive and acknowledge commands from ground, and log files have been requested and received. Due to the very high tumbling (more than 2.5 Hz) it has not been possible to decode log files.

In March 2012, the AAUSAT-II mission was officially retired by the project — but the CubeSat is still up and running. As of 2022, the satellite continues to function.

== Mission definition ==
AAUSAT-II consists of several sub-systems:

- ADCS: Attitude Determination and Control System
- CDH: Command and Datahandling System
- COM: Communication System
- EPS: Electrical Power System
- GND: Ground Station
- MCC: Mission Control Center
- MECH: Mechanical System
- OBC: On-board Computer System
- P/L: Payload System

Technical details:

Dimensions	100 by 100 by 113 millimetres (3.9 in × 3.9 in × 4.4 in) CubeSat standard
Mass	750 grams (26 oz)
Expected lifetime	Minimum 1 month, extended until end of lifetime
Attitude determination system	Sun sensors, gyro sensors, magnetometers
Attitude control system	Momentum wheel and magnetic coils
Power	Solar-cell panels located in satellite surface
Batteries	Li-ion 8.2V 2200 mAh
Power bus	3.3 and 5V regulated

== Amateur radio information ==
- Callsign: OZ2CUB
- Up/downlink: 437.425 MHz AFSK & FSK
- Bit rate: 1200-9600 bit/s (1200 as standard mode)
- AX.25 FM CW TLM

== See also ==
- List of CubeSats
