= Istanbul Technical University Control and Automation Student Society =

Student society at Istanbul Technical University

OTOKON
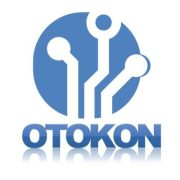
- Founded: 2004
- Type: Student Society
- Purpose: Student Organization, Robotic Competition, Electrical, Electronics
- Location: Istanbul Technical University
- Region served: Istanbul Technical University
- Members: 641+
- Website: www.otokon.itu.edu.tr

The Control and Automation Student Society is a student society established in 2004. It was formed by Istanbul Technical University as a non-profit, non-governmental, non-political society, mostly from Faculty of Electrical and Electronics Engineering students. It has more than 600 members in Electrical and Electronics Faculty, Astronautics and Aeronautics Faculty and others.

== Organizations ==
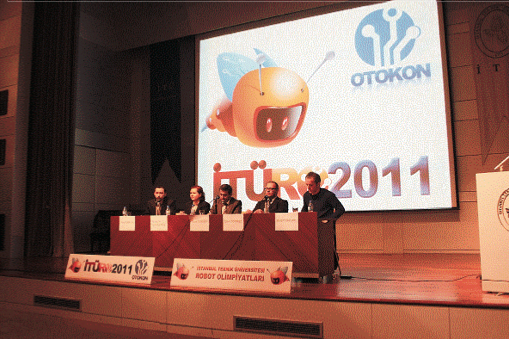
Human-Robot Interaction Seminar in ITURO 2011

The primary organization that is hosted by the Istanbul Technical University Control and Automation Student Society is ITU Robotic Olympics (ITURO). ITURO celebrated its 6th year in 2011, with its ongoing mission of gathering robotic enthusiasts together and hosting a huge number of competitors, audiences, and media.

Istanbul Technical University Control and Automation Student Society was one of the organizers of Automatic Control National Conference in cooperation with the Turkish National Committee of Automatic Control (TOK) in 2008. In 2010, OTOKON also organized the International Conference of Mechatronics (ICM), which is held by the Institute of Electrical and Electronics Engineers (IEEE). For this cooperation and organization, OTOKON received an award from IEEE. In 2011, OTOKON was nominated for best Student Society by ITU Student Societies Association.

== Awards ==
The Society's members have participated in inter-disciplinary projects that are held in ITU. Notable examples include: winning the CanSat Competition that was held by the American Institute of Aeronautics and Astronautics (AIAA) and American Astronomical Society (AAS) in the United States; winning the Board of European Students of Technology's competition of engineering in Turkey; being nominated for the 3rd position in the Solar Splash Competition with solar powered boats, as well as participating in the solar powered car (ARIBA) and hydrogen powered car (HYDROBEE) projects. Members of the society have also enrolled in many international competitions, such as RoboCup, Euroskills, WorldSkills, and Imagine Cup.

== See also ==
- Istanbul Technical University, a leading technical university of Turkey
- ITU IEEE Student Branch, a similar Student Society in ITU
