= SwissCube-1 =

Swiss satellite launched in 2009

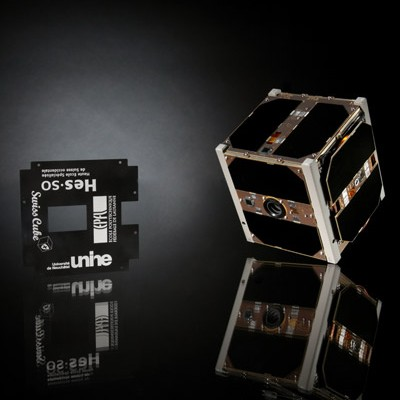
- Mission type: Atmospheric; Technology
- Operator: EPFL
- COSPAR ID: 2009-051B
- SATCAT no.: 35932
- Website: swisscube.epfl.ch
- Mission duration: 3-12 months planned 15 years, 5 months, 11 days (elasped)

Spacecraft properties
- Spacecraft type: 1U CubeSat
- Launch mass: 1 kilogram (2.2 lb)

Start of mission
- Launch date: 23 September 2009, 06:21 UTC
- Rocket: PSLV-CA C14
- Launch site: Satish Dhawan FLP
- Contractor: ISRO

Orbital parameters
- Reference system: Geocentric
- Regime: Sun-synchronous
- Perigee altitude: 710 kilometres (440 mi)
- Apogee altitude: 722 kilometres (449 mi)
- Inclination: 98.39 degrees
- Period: 98.97 minutes
- Epoch: 24 January 2015, 04:38:10 UTC

SwissCube-1 is a Swiss satellite operated by École Polytechnique Fédérale de Lausanne (EPFL). The spacecraft is a single unit CubeSat, which was designed to conduct research into nightglow within the Earth's atmosphere, and to develop technology for future spacecraft. It has also been used for amateur radio. It was the first Swiss satellite to be launched.

== History ==
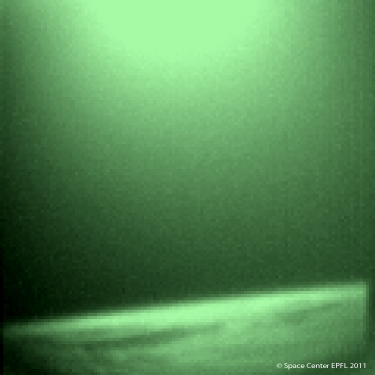
The first airglow image of the satellite.

SwissCube-1 was launched by the Indian Space Research Organisation aboard the Polar Satellite Launch Vehicle, serial number C14, flying in the Core Alone, or PSLV-CA, configuration. The launch took place from the First Launch Pad at the Satish Dhawan Space Centre, at 06:21 UTC on 23 September 2009. SwissCube-1 was a secondary payload aboard the rocket, which deployed the Oceansat-2 satellite. Five other secondary payloads were flown aboard the rocket; BeeSat-1, UWE-2, ITU-pSat1, Rubin 9.1 and Rubin 9.2.

SwissCube-1 is operating in a Sun-synchronous orbit with an apogee of 752 kilometres (467 mi), a perigee of 726 kilometres (451 mi) and 98.28 degrees of inclination to the equator. It has an orbital period of 98.5 minutes.

Its mission was expected to last between three and twelve months. The mission was extended an additional 18 months in February 2010 and an additional ground command facility was added. It took its first picture on 18 February 2011 and its first airglow picture on 3 March 2011.

On 2 December 2011, EPFL ended the SwissCube project and turned over control of the satellite to amateur radio operators. As of October 2023 SwissCube is still operational, after fourteen years in space.

In anticipation of its future "debris" status in light of the slowly degrading lithium-ion batteries, the Clean Space One project was launched in 2012 to provide a spacecraft able to catch SwissCube-1 and remove it from orbit in the 2020 horizon. Following a successful tender for European Space Agency funding, the Clean Space One project was redirected towards another target.

== Software architecture ==
- System documentation
- The COM (communication), PL (payload), ADCS (attitude and orientation), and EPS (energy) subsystems all have a MSP430F1611 microcontroller
- The CDMS (on board computer) has an ATMEL ARM AT91M55800A

These microcontrollers used two I^{2}C buses to communicate : one main bus (all subsystems) and one fallback bus (only EPS and COM). The cubesat had 4 operation modes : recovery (not enough power to work), safe (minimum subsystems running), and two standard modes (all subsystems are working nominally).

== See also ==
- 2009 in spaceflight
- List of CubeSats
