= BeeSat-1 =

German satellite

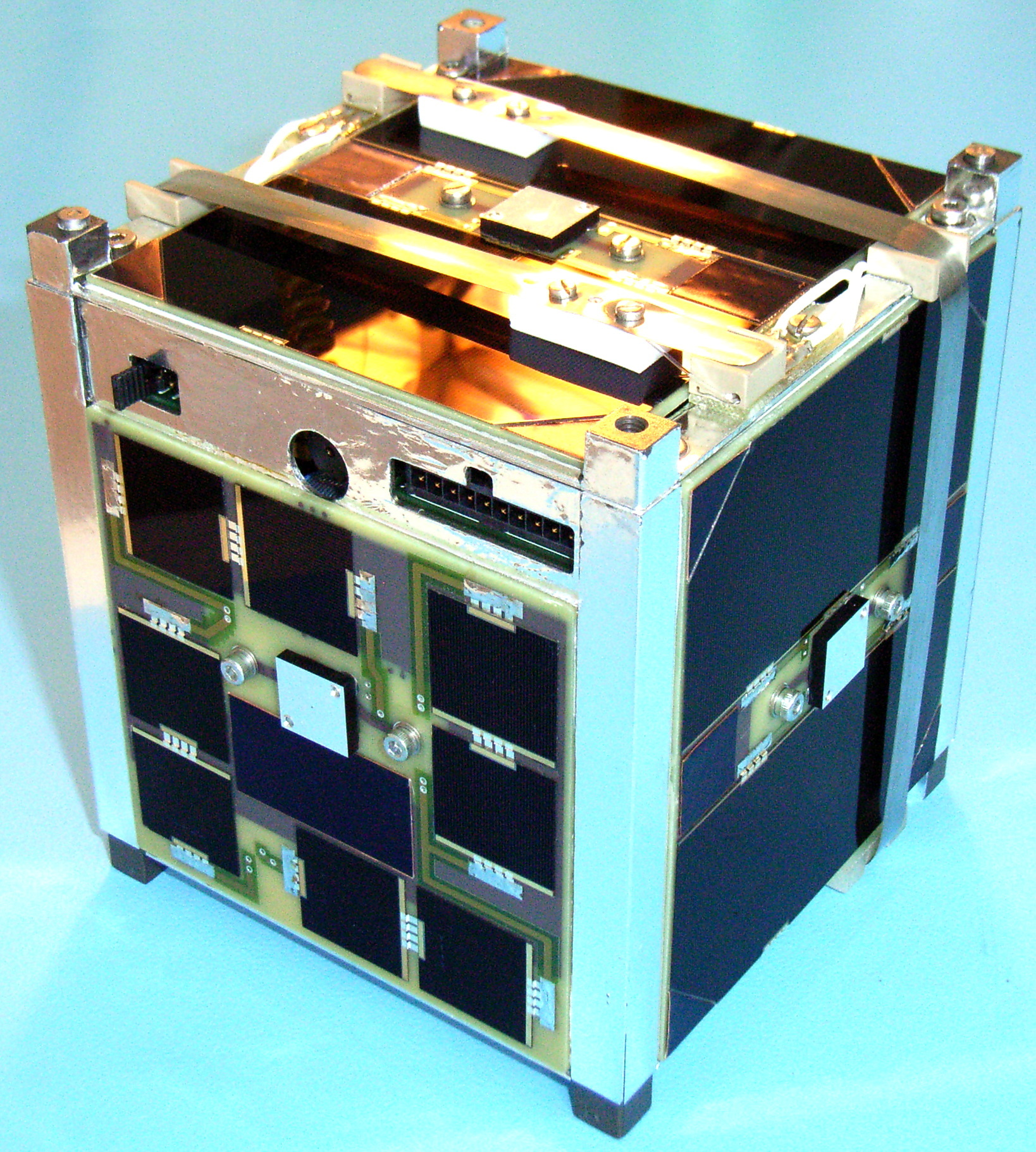
- BeeSat-1 before launch
- Mission type: Technology
- Operator: Technische Universität Berlin
- COSPAR ID: 2009-051C
- SATCAT no.: 35933
- Website: www.raumfahrttechnik.tu-berlin.de/beesat/v-menue2/project_overview/
- Mission duration: 12 months (planned); 15+ months (achieved)

Spacecraft properties
- Spacecraft type: 1U CubeSat
- Launch mass: 1 kilogram (2.2 lb)

Start of mission
- Launch date: 23 September 2009, 06:21 UTC
- Rocket: PSLV-CA C14
- Launch site: Satish Dhawan FLP
- Contractor: ISRO

Orbital parameters
- Reference system: Geocentric
- Regime: Sun-synchronous
- Perigee altitude: 713 kilometres (443 mi)
- Apogee altitude: 723 kilometres (449 mi)
- Inclination: 98.36 degrees
- Period: 99.01 minutes
- Epoch: 21 January 2014, 05:49:02 UTC

BeeSat-1 or Berlin Experimental and Educational Satellite 1, is a German satellite operated by Technische Universität Berlin. The spacecraft is a single unit CubeSat, which was designed to test systems intended for use on future spacecraft, including a new design of reaction wheel. It has also been used for amateur radio, and is equipped with a small camera.

BeeSat-1 was launched by a Polar Satellite Launch Vehicle, serial number C14, flying in the Core Alone, or PSLV-CA, configuration. The launch took place from the First Launch Pad at the Satish Dhawan Space Centre, at 06:21 UTC on 23 September 2009. BeeSat-1 was a secondary payload aboard the rocket, which deployed the Oceansat-2 satellite. Five other secondary payloads were flown aboard the rocket; SwissCube-1, UWE-2, ITU-pSat1, Rubin 9.1 and Rubin 9.2.

BeeSat-1 is operating in a Sun-synchronous orbit with an apogee of 723 kilometres (449 mi), a perigee of 714 kilometres (444 mi) and 98.4 degrees of inclination to the equator. It has an orbital period of 99.16 minutes. BeeSat-1 was designed to operate for at least twelve months, and as of January 2011 it is still operational.

In 2024, German hacker PistonMiner repaired a number of software issues on the BeeSat-1, restored the telemetry function, and downloaded images from the camera for the first time. Their work was presented at the 38th Chaos Communication Congress in Hamburg.

== Hardware ==
BeeSat-1 is a cubesat with a form factor of 10cm. Each subsystem has a backup except for the sensors and the camera and all subsystems are connected by 2 redundant CAN busses. The antenna enables a 4.8 kbps half-duplex communication with the ground station in Berlin. The on-board computer (OBC) includes a ARM7TDMI CPU, 2MB of SRAM, 16MB of software flash and 4MB of telemetry flash that stores telemetry data when the ground station is out of reach as communication can only be done for 10 to 15 minutes 6 to 8 times a day.

The satellite currently runs on the backup on-board computer after the primary computer's configuration in the flash was corrupted by an unplanned reset, which made it send invalid data.

== See also ==
- 2009 in spaceflight
- List of CubeSats
