= Istanbul Technical University Fuat Kulunk High Voltage Laboratory =

ITU Fuat Kulunk High Voltage Laboratory, located in Gumussuyu, Istanbul, is a high voltage laboratory that belongs to Istanbul Technical University. It is the first and largest high voltage laboratory in Turkey, largest university high voltage laboratory in the world and is one of the largest of Europe. The Laboratory consists of three main blocks. It was founded by Prof. Dr. Franz Doppler in 1938 and reorganized by Prof. Dr. Fuat Kulunk, who is also the first dean of school of electrical and electronics engineering, in 1945. It was later upgraded to its current level by Professor Izzet Gonenc.

- Impulse Voltage Laboratory
  - Test set: Impulse voltage generator (1 MV, 10 kJ).
- Alternating Voltage Laboratory
  - Test set: High voltage transformer (300 kV, 50 Hz, 50 kVA).
- Shielded High Voltage Room
  - Test set: High voltage transformer (100 kV, 50 Hz, 20 kVA),
- Impulse generator
  - The impulse equipment consists of a 3600 kV, 180 kJ impulse generator
- Alternating Voltage Set
  - The 50 Hz equipment consists of a 1200 kV, 1000 kVA test transformer.
- DC Voltage Supply
  - The ratings of dc high voltage generator set are 1 MV and 10 mA.
- Tesla Transformer
  - The ratings of a Tesla Transformer are 400–500 kV, 150–300 kHz.
