= ISS-RapidScat =

Wind speed instrument (2014–2016)

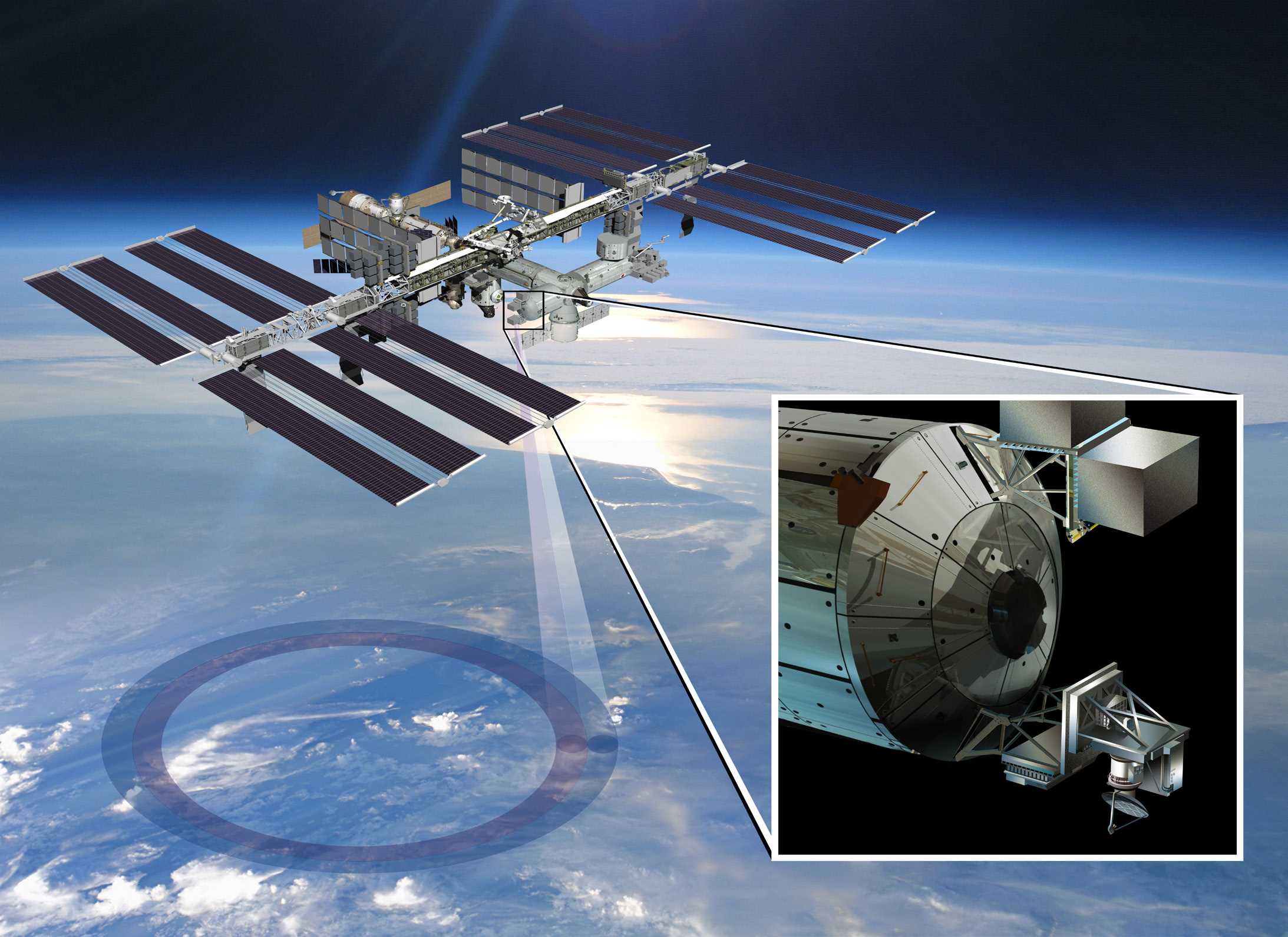
Depiction of ISS-RapidScat's location on ISS and its operation

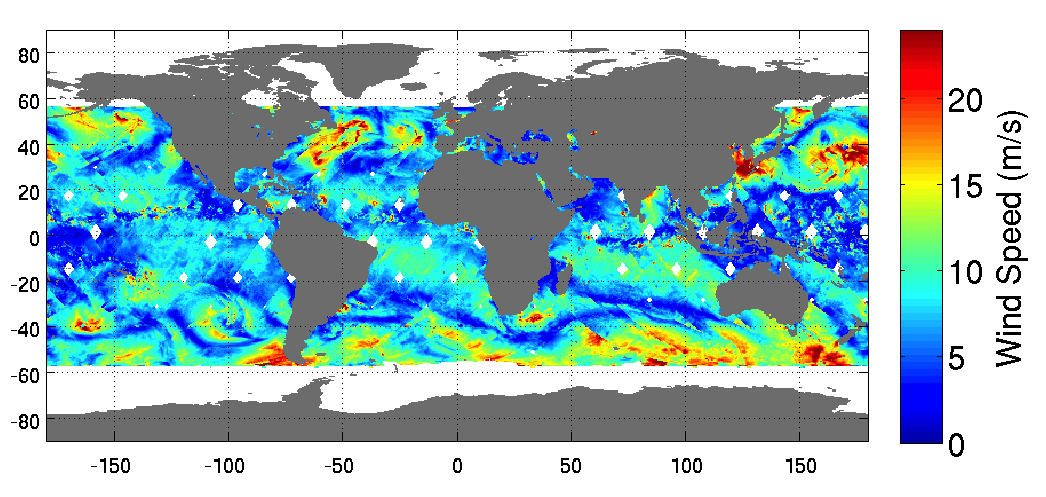
ISS-RapidScat data from October 2014

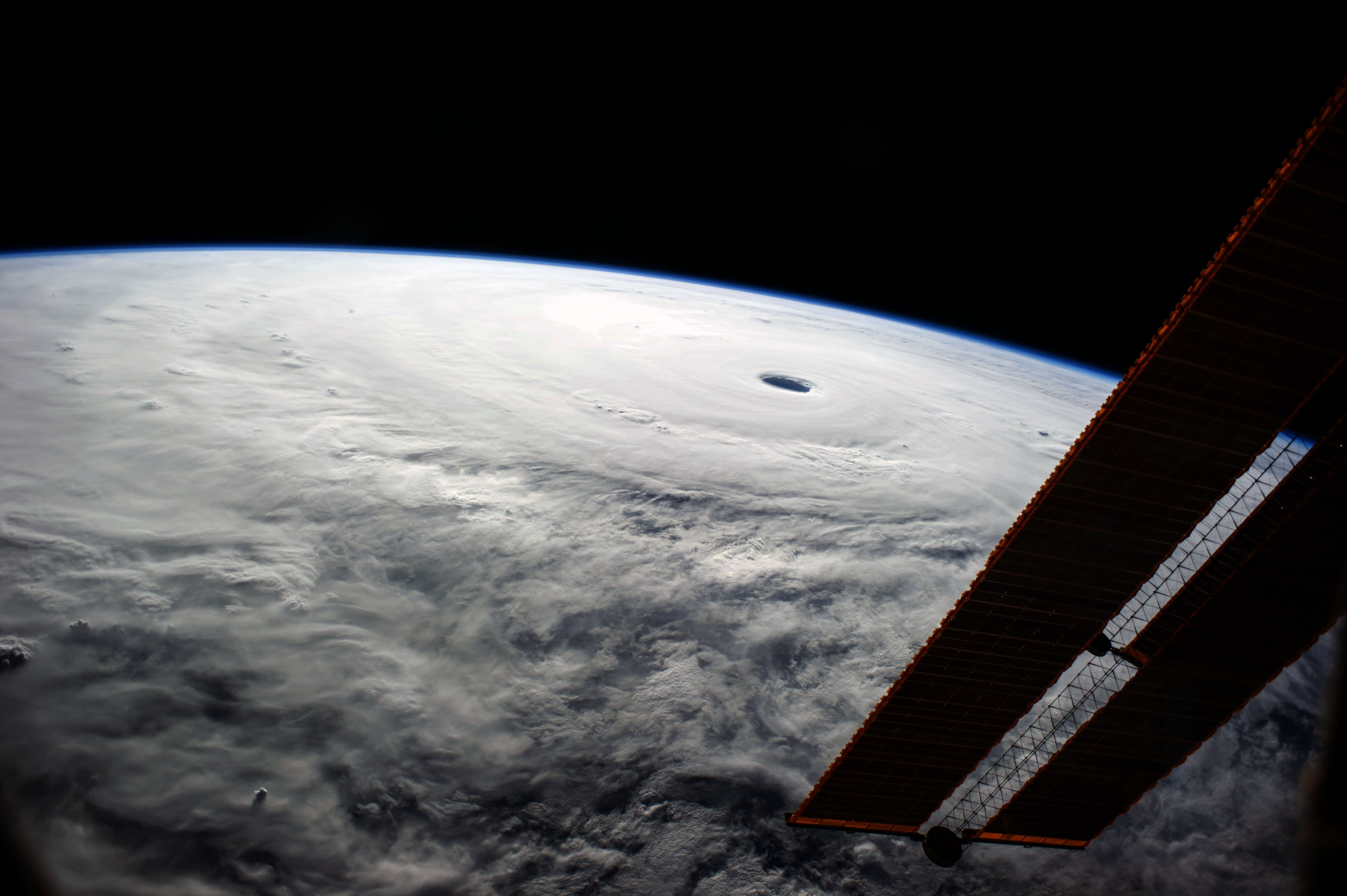
ISS-RapidScat returned data on weather like Typhoon Vongfong, pictured here as seen from ISS in 2014

ISS-RapidScat was an instrument mounted to the International Space Station's Columbus module that measured wind speeds. It was launched aboard SpaceX CRS-4 in September 2014 and operated until August 2016. ISS-RapidScat was a scatterometer designed to support weather forecasting by bouncing microwaves off the ocean's surface to measure wind speed via wind waves. It featured a 75 cm (30 in) rotating radar dish that operated at 13.4 GHz (K_{u} band). It could collect data between 51.6 degrees north and south latitude, with a swath 900 km wide (560 mi).

The ISS-RapidScat program was initiated in response to the failure of the QuikSCAT satellite's antenna rotation mechanism in November 2009. While the spacecraft continued to function, it could only gather data in one direction, significantly limiting its data collection ability. ISS-RapidScat was built by the Jet Propulsion Laboratory from elements of QuikSCAT's SeaWinds instrument engineering model, originally used to validate that instrument's flight hardware prior to its launch in 1999. It was constructed in 18 months; re-using the QuikScat hardware had the double benefit of reducing cost and using already flight-proven hardware that functioned well in orbit.

ISS-RapidScat was very similar to QuikSCAT in functionality. However, the instrument suffered due to peculiarities of the International Space Station, such as the station's varying altitude due to increased drag, its variable orientation due to the demands of visiting spacecraft, and its lack of a Sun-synchronous orbit. By the time of ISS-RapidScat's launch, the European Space Agency's MetOp series were the only two satellites with fully functioning scatterometers in orbit. Some of these peculiarities were also advantages. Its mid-latitude orbit meant it was able to collect data about the same spot on Earth at different times of day, whereas the Sun-synchronous orbits used by other scatterometer-equipped spacecraft would re-visit the same location on Earth at the same time daily. This allowed scientists to study how the wind changes at one location over the course of a day. This orbit also gives better coverage of the tropics, and by crossing the orbit of other satellites, it was able to observe the same area at the same time as them, allowing for cross-calibration between the different data sets.

Objectives of the ISS-RapidScat program were to mitigate the loss of and provide continuity of wind data products from the QuikSCAT SeaWinds instrument, to serve as a calibration standard for the international constellation of scatterometer-equipped satellites, and to sample the diurnal and semi-diurnal wind variations that occur between ISS flight latitudes at least every two months.

The scatterometer was launched as external cargo aboard the SpaceX CRS-4 mission on 21 September 2014, attached to the unpressurized section of the Dragon capsule. Dragon was berthed to the station on 23 September. The instrument was removed from Dragon, robotically assembled and attached to Columbus between 29 and 30 September. It was powered up on 1 October and immediately began gathering data, which was first processed into an uncalibrated product on 3 October. ISS-RapidScat was declared fully operational and its data products properly calibrated on 10 November.

One of ISS-RapidScat's first observations was of Tropical Storm Simon off the coast of the Baja California Peninsula on 3 October 2014. It also played a role in observing the Category 5 Hurricane Patricia in October 2015, which was noted as one of the most powerful hurricanes on record, with maximum sustained winds of 185 kn (343 km/h; 213 mph). Data from ISS-RapidScat was disseminated worldwide for use in weather forecasting, and was used by the United States Navy, NOAA, and EUMETSAT, among others.

== Decommissioning ==
On 19 August 2016, the Columbus module, which ISS-RapidScat was attached to and reliant on for resources, suffered a power distribution unit failure, which resulted in ISS-RapidScat shutting down. This was followed by an electrical overload in the power distribution unit during recovery efforts. Attempts to restore the instrument were unsuccessful, and NASA terminated operations on 28 November 2016. No replacement or followup was planned.

ISS-RapidScat was removed from the Columbus module on 1 January 2018 and stowed inside the SpaceX CRS-13 Dragon trunk. On 13 January 2018, the trunk section with ISS-RapidScat re-entered Earth's atmosphere and was destroyed as planned, while the Dragon capsule and its cargo landed in the Pacific Ocean and were recovered.

== See also ==
- ADEOS I (Included NSCAT instrument)
- Oceansat-2 (included SCAT instrument)
- SCATSAT-1 (included OSCAT-2 instrument)
