= ITURO =

Istanbul Technical University Robot Olympics (ITURO) (Turkish: İstanbul Teknik Üniversitesi Robot Olimpiyatları (İTÜRO)) is a robotic organization consisting competitions, seminars, colloquies, panel discussions, exhibitions and workshops that has been hosted by Istanbul Technical University Control and Automation Student Society since 2007. The three-day organization ITURO is organized at ITU Suleyman Demirel Cultural Center in Ayazağa Campus in every spring. In 2015, there were ten categories and the categories are being updated every year. Also, by the participation of experienced academics and industrial representatives, topics related to robotics and technology become discussed in both national and international manner.

== Purposes ==
- Drawing attention on robotics,
- Supporting interested people through seminars and colloquies with knowledge and experience, facilitating exhibitions for their works,
- Discussing the progress of robotics science and technology,
- Exploring new sights of robotics education,
- Questioning the capabilities of robot projects in industrial point of view and supporting them to become higher-level,
- Helping students to get in contact with academics and industrial representatives,
- Providing and supporting international communication in order to contribute to the development of robotics technology.

== Competitions ==
=== Line following ===
In this category, robots are aimed to maintain the position on the white line on a black track or the black line on a white track, by the help of the sensors they contain. The competition has three stages, which get harder in progress. Each robot compete one-by-one; the robot that complete the track including gates, ramps and bridges in the shortest period wins the competition. Further, in case of getting out-of-track or crashing on the gate, the robot gets a penalty in the scoring. The track is 40 cm in width and the lines on it are 2 cm in width.

=== Basketball ===
In this category, robots must sense the hoops and score baskets.

=== Micro sumo ===
This category consists of one-on-one matches on a ring called dojo. The robots are set to get the opponent robot out of the dojo. The robot that stays on the dojo wins one of the three rounds. After group matches, qualification stage proceeds and after that stage, final group qualifies. Succeeding final group matches, the robot that finishes the matches in the leader position wins the competition. A micro sumo robot should fit in a 5 cm × 5 cm box (in length and width). Dojos are round-shaped and 38.5 cm in width.

=== Fire fighting ===
In this category, robots are aimed to extinguish the candles in a maze-like built platform by the help of their sensors. The robots compete one-by-one and the robot that extinguished most candles in a certain time wins the competition. It is forbidden to use water, foam etc. to extinguish; robots have to blow air on candles. Also in case of knocking candles down or turning on the extinguishing system on an area without fire, the robot gets a penalty in the scoring. The width of the paths on the maze is 40 cm in width and the height of the walls are 20 cm in width.

=== Stair climbing ===
The robots competing in this category aims to climb a stairway with a continuously increasing height of steps. The robots compete one-by-one and the robot that has most stairs climbed up and down in the shortest time wins the competition. The stairs are 40 cm in width and 10 cm, 15 cm and 20 cm in height respectively.

=== Maze ===
The robots in this category are to finish the maze in two stages: Memorizing and application. The robots try to track the correct path by distinguish the right and wrong paths over the maze and aim to get out of it. Each robot compete one-by-one and the robot that managed to get out of the maze in the shortest period of time wins the competition. Crashing on walls and tracking the wrong path in the application stage occurs a penalty in the scoring. The corridors are 20 cm long and 20 cm wide.

=== Color Selecting ===
In this category robots must carry the cubes to correct colored areas.

=== Self-balancing robot ===
The robots of this category have two wheels in parallel and set to maintain their balance on a flat field. To participate the second stage, the robots have to succeed the first round: The time test. Also, robots get extra points in inclined starting position and external force tests in the first stage if they manage to accomplish those. In the second stage, the robots are expected to have motion on a track including a bridge and this motion shapes the scoring. Each robot compete one-by-one and the robot collected the highest score wins the competition.

=== Scenario: Construction ===
In this category, which launched first at ITURO 2015, robots try to construct the structure that is already given before the competition with the blocks which are supplied them as flawless and fast as they can.

=== Innovative Category ===
In this category, the participants exhibit their projects to the Innovative Category jury and the subscribers for all three days. The jury that arranged by the ITURO staff scores the projects in the criterion of mechanical design, usage of technical knowledge, innovation, actuality and performance in presentation and the winner project becomes determined. The most interesting robots of ITURO compete in this category.

== Previous ITUROs ==
Organization	Pre-registered projects	Categories	Panel Discussions	Seminar	Colloquy	Exhibition	Workshop
ITURO 2015 April 9-10-11 2015 Suleyman Demirel Cultural Center, ITU	739	Micro-Sumo; Line Following; Fire Fighting; Self-Balancing; Maze; Basketball; Colour Selecting; Stair Climbing; Scenario; Innovative Category	Internet of Things; Mustafa Kasap (Microsoft); Cem Vedat Işık (Intel); Tolga Bizel (Mitsubishi); Serkan Türkeli (ITU); Güray Yıldırım (ITU Graduate Student)	Artificial Intelligence and Strategy Games; Vasif Vagifoğlu Nabiyev (Karadeniz Technical University): The iCub Project: An Open Platform for Research in Artificial Cognitive Systems; Giorgio Metta (Italian Institute of Technology)			Intelligent Servo Motors with Dynamixel; Gilbo: From Design to Reality Self-Balancing Robot on CATIA Program; ITU Graduate Student Mertcan Cibooğlu
ITURO 2014 April 10-11-12 2014 Suleyman Demirel Cultural Center, ITU	583	Micro-Sumo; Line Following; Vacuum Cleaning; Fire Fighting; Self-Balancing; Maze; Basketball; Colour Selecting; Stair Climbing; Scenario; Innovative Category	Robotics in Medicine; İnci Çilesiz (ITU); Hakan Kaya (Huma Hospital); Hakan Kaya (Cordamed); SerkanTüreli (ITU); UfukTopçu (ITU)	21. Century Robotics Okyay Kaynak; Artificial Intelligence, Natural Intelligence and Mutual Intelligence Prof.Dr FatoşYarmanVural			
ITURO 2013 April 11-12-13 2013 Suleyman Demirel Cultural Center, ITU	911	Mini Sumo; Micro Sumo; Line Follower; Vacuum Cleaner; Fire Fighter; Maze; Self Balancing Robot; Stair Climbing; Quest; Innovative Category	Inspiration by Nature in Robotic: Abdülkadir Erden (Atılım University); Şima Etner Uyar (ITU); Research Assistant Doğan Altan (ITU); H. Cengiz Celep (Entek); Lalehan Can (FESTO)	Swarmanoid Robots Marco Dorigo	ROSSI – The robot with speech recognition- Erol Şahin		
ITURO 2012 April 12–13–14; 2012 Suleyman Demirel Cultural Center, ITU	855	Minisumo; Line Following; Vacuum Cleaner; Fire Fighting; Maze; Self-Balancing; Innovative Category	Route of Robotics in Turkey: Levent Akın (Boğaziçi University); Ahmet Kuzucu (ITU); Erol Uyar (Dokuz Eylül University in İzmir); H. Cengiz Celep (Entek); Ahmet Sakallı (ITU Control Engineering Department, Bachelor's Student); Enver Candan (ITU Control Engineering Department, Bachelor's Student)	Hands-on Training on LEGO - Mindstorms Robots for Mechatronics' First Year Students Michael Beitelschmidt (TU Dresden); Artificial Visualization Systems Hülya Yalçın (ITU)	Underwater Visualization Robots Engin Aygün; Eurobot TURAG Eurobot Team	Search&Rescue Robots Emin Faruk Keçeci; Hobby Robots Neotech; Underwater Robots Engin Aygün; TURAG Team Competition Robot, Scrat; Human-Interactive Robot Entek Education Technologies	Humanoid Hobby Robot Neotech
ITURO 2011 March 31, April 1–2, 2011 Suleyman Demirel Cultural Center, ITU	651	Minisumo; Line Following; Vacuum Cleaner; Fire Fighting; Maze; Self-Balancing; Innovative Category	Robot-Human Relationship: Emre Sönmez (Schunk Turkey General Director); Bahadır Kılıç (Staubli); Turan Türkmen (Association of Turkish Automation Industrialists, Chief of Educational Committee); Hatice Köse Bağcı (ITU); M. Alper Yükselen (ITU Bachelor's Student)	Robot Development & Learning Are Hard Damien Jade Duff (University of Birmingham); Medical Robotic Applications Research Assistant A. Ali Şen (Gazi University NanoMedicals and Higher Technology Research and Application Center); Humanoid Robot SURALP Design and Experimental Studies Kemalettin Erbatur (Sabancı University)	ITU Colloquy with Robocup Team and Exhibition Match	6-Axis Anthropomorphic Robot Arm Staubli	
ITURO 2010 April 15–16–17; 2010 Suleyman Demirel Cultural Center, ITU	613	Minisumo; Line Following; Vacuum Cleaner; Fire Fighting; Self-Balancing; Innovative Category	The Role of Robotic Education in Turkey and The Industry's Expectation: Turan Türkmen (Association of Turkish Automation Industrialists, Chief of Educational Committee); Murat Yeşiloğlu (ITU); Ali Fuat Ergenç (ITU); A. Ali Şen (Manager of Industrial Robotic Department in Otes Electronics); Graduated Engineer Alpaslan YILDIZ (ITU Doctorate Student)	Determining Flight Path for Unmanned Aerial Vehicles in Intense Environments and Aggressive Control of Unmanned Combat Planes Emre Koyuncu (ITU), Kemal Üre (ITU); Rehabilitation and Medical Robots Duygun Erol Barkana (Yeditepe University); Multi-Robot Systems and Applications Sanem Sarıel Talay (ITU); Design and Control of An Unmanned Submarine Kemal Leblebicioğlu (METU); Humanoid Robots Kemalettin Erbatur (Sabancı University)	A Different Point of View About Ethical Manners of Robotics: Why Patent? What Are Brand Awareness, Beneficial Model and Industrial Design? Marpataş Patent; BeeStanbul: ITU RoboCup Team Colloquy BeeStanbul (ITU)	Mobile Robot ITU Mechatronics Education and Research Center; Industrial Cartesian Robots Otes Elektronics; Humanoid Robots Cite IT	
İTÜRO 2009 April 16-17-18, 2009 Suleyman Demirel Cultural Center, ITU	563	Minisumo; Line Following; Vacuum Cleaner; Cylinder Carrying; Fire Fighting; Self-Balancing; Innovative Category	Development of Robotics in Turkey: Emin Olcay (Association of Turkish Automation Industrialists, Chief of Administrative Committee); Turan Türkmen (Association of Turkish Automation Industrialists, Chief of Educational Committee); Erol Uyar (İzmir Dokuz Eylül University); Bahadır Kılıç (Manager of Robotics Department, Staubli); Emre Sönmez (Manager of Schunk Turkey); Onur Şencan (ITU Control Engineering Graduate Student)	Examples on First Automats Atilla Bir (ITU); Horizontal Movement on Robots Ahmet Kuzucu(ITU); Robotics in Industry Tunç Acarkan (Robotic Application Engineer, Staubli); Humanoid Robots Kemalettin Erbatur (Sabancı University)	Broadcasting Robot Cem Arslan	6-Axis Anthropomorphic Robot Arm Staubli; Underwater Robot Erol Uyar (İzmir Dokuz Eylül University); Indoor Navigation Robot Erol Uyar (İzmir Dokuz Eylül University)	
ITURO 2008 May 1-2-3; 2008 Suleyman Demirel Cultural Center, ITU	375	Minisumo; Line Following; Vacuum Cleaner; Cylinder Carrying; Fire Fighting; Self-Balancing; Innovative Category	Control Science and Today's Robotics: Hakan Temeltaş (ITU); Atilla Bir (ITU); Coşkun Sönmez (Yıldız Technical University); Taner İncirci (Kale Altınay Robotics)	Image Processing with Integrated Cameras on a Robot Murat Yeşiloğlu (ITU); Learning of Robots Levent Akın (Boğaziçi University); Multi-Robot Systems Research Assistant Sanem Sarıel (ITU)	Quadcopter Colloquy OTOKON; Robotist Team, Robocup Coloquy ITU	Miniature artist Leman Dinçtürk's Exhibition of Al-Jazari's Automats' Miniatures; Al-Jazari Documentary and Presentation Oğuz Makal (Beykent University); Ancient Discoveries: Robots The History Channel	Microsoft Turkey's ITURO 2008 Workshop
ITURO 2007 April 24-25-26th 2007 Suleyman Demirel Cultural Center, ITU	362	Minisumo; Sumo; Line Following; Vacuum Cleaner; Cylinder Carrying; Fire Fighting; Innovative Category		Al-Jazari Atilla Bir (ITU); Multi-Robotic Systems Murat Yeşiloğlu (ITU); Robocup and Football Robots Boğaziçi University Cerberus Robocup Team; Animation Choreographing with Music and Image Processing Based Learning Yasemin Demir (Koç University); Dolphin Robot Ahmet Kuzucu (ITU); Robotics in Industry Mustafa Yılmazer (Kale Altınay Robotics); Robotics and Artificial Intelligence Levent Akın (Boğaziçi University); Use of Parallel Robots in Medical Field Meltem Elitaş (Sabancı University); Aerorobotics and Group Intelligence for Air Fleets Gökhan Ünalhan (ITU); Coordinated Movement of Autonomous Mobile Robots Levent Güvenç (ITU)			

The seventh ITURO, ITURO 2013 will be organized on April 11-12-13th 2013, at ITU Suleyman Demirel Cultural Center
