= Istanbul Technical University Faculty of Aeronautics and Astronautics =

Academic faculty of Istanbul Technical University

ITU Faculty of Aeronautics and Astronautics
- Type: Public school
- Established: 1944 as a department, March 3, 1983
- Dean: Prof. Dr. Zahit Mecitoğlu
- Location: Istanbul, Turkey
- Campus: Urban
- Website: www.uubf.itu.edu.tr

ITU Faculty of Aeronautics and Astronautics, founded in 1983, is the 11th school of Istanbul Technical University. Three departments were engaged to the faculty, which are Aeronautical Engineering, Astronautical engineering, and Meteorological Engineering. Aeronautical Engineering Department was established as a branch training aeronautical engineers in the Mechanical Engineering Faculty in 1941, and then in 1944 became a department of the Mechanical Engineering Faculty. Meteorological Engineering Department was established in 1953 in the Faculty of Electrical and Electronics Engineering. It is the only Meteorological Engineering department in Turkey.

== See also ==
- ITUpSAT1, first Turkish cubesat
