= Mustafa İnan Library =

Library located in Istanbul Technical University

Mustafa Inan Library
- Mustafa İnan Kütüphanesi
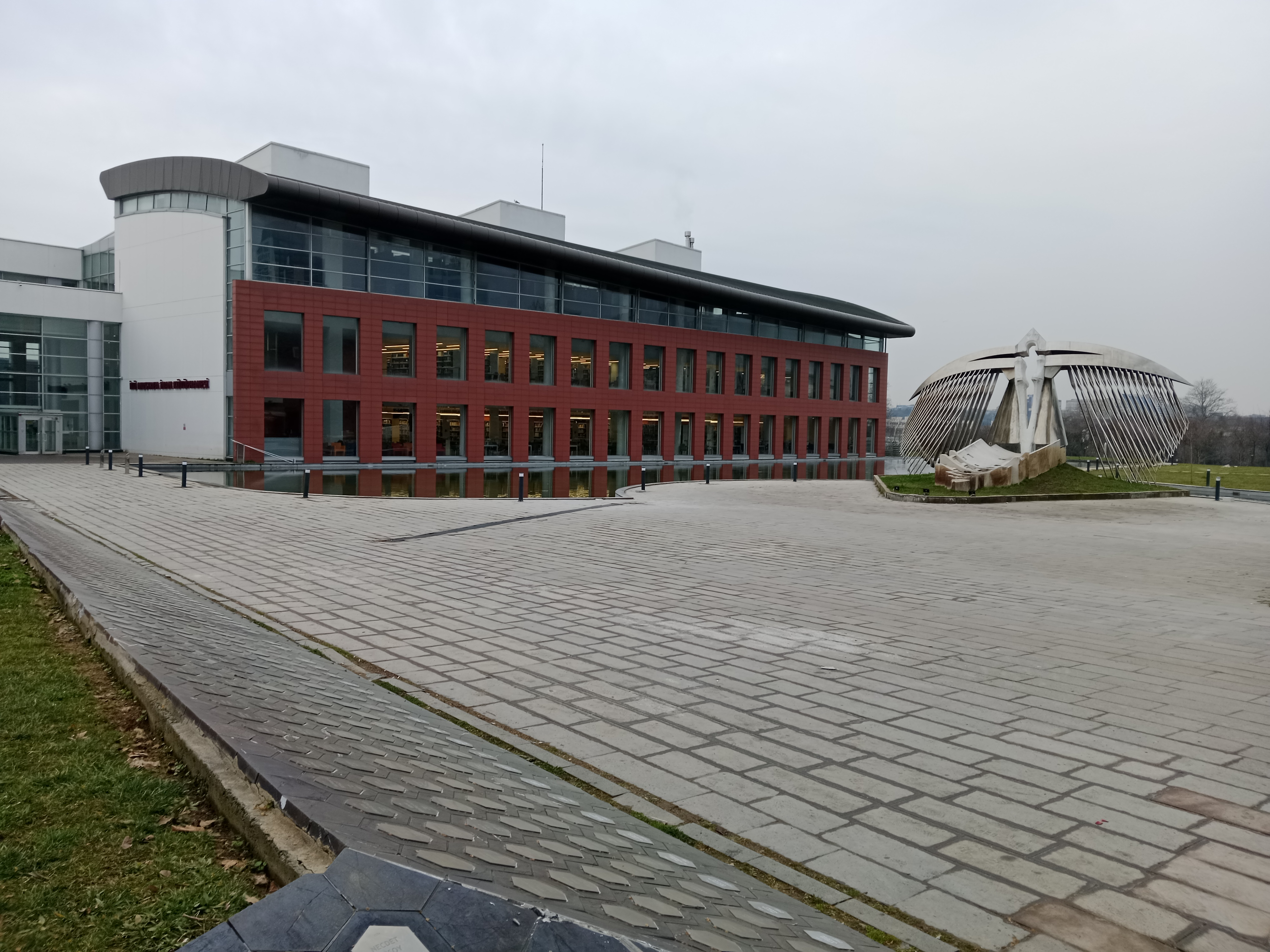
- 41.10387516072467°N 29.02144760924108°E
- Location: Istanbul, Turkey
- Established: 1795 printing house, 1983 library

Collection
- Size: 500,000 volumes

Other information
- Budget: $3,000,000, approximately
- Director: Ayhan Kaygusuz
- Website: www.library.itu.edu.tr

The Mustafa Inan Library was a printing house was established in 1795 at the first engineering school ever to be opened in Halıcıoğlu under the name of Mühendishane-i Berri Hümayun. The books published here constituted the core of the ITU Library. ITU libraries, located in Maslak campus, Istanbul, have approximately 500,000 volumes of books periodicals, and dissertations. The number of subscription periodicals is 1,300. A part of the library is open 7 day/24 hours. There are libraries in other campuses of ITU: Ratip Berker Library in School of Mechanical engineering, Macka library, Taskisla library and Tuzla library. In addition to these general purpose libraries there is a music library in Macka campus for Turkish Music State Conservatory.
