= Istanbul Technical University Faculty of Mechanical Engineering =

ITU Faculty of Mechanical Engineering
- Type: Public university
- Established: 1944
- Dean: Prof. Dr. İlker Murat Koç
- Location: Istanbul, Turkey
- Campus: Urban
- Website: www.mkn.itu.edu.tr

ITU Faculty of Mechanical Engineering (Turkish: İTÜ Makina Fakültesi) is a faculty of the Istanbul Technical University, ITU.

The faculty is located on the university's Gümüşsuyu, Beyoğlu campus in Istanbul, and has a mechanical engineering department.

== Notable alumni ==
- Necmettin Erbakan
- Çağla Kubat
- Üzeyir Garih
- Mehmet Toner
