= Emin Onat =

Turkish architect (1908–1961)

- Born: December 20, 1908; Istanbul, Ottoman Empire
- Died: July 17, 1961 (aged 52); Istanbul, Turkey
- Occupation: Architect
- Awards: Istanbul Palace of Justice, 1st prize, 1949; Anıtkabir International Architectural Design Competition, 1st Prize, 1942; Sivas People House Building Project Competition, 2nd Prize, 1938; Kadikoy People House Building Project Competition, 2nd Prize, 1938; Yürükali Beach Architectural Design Competition, 1st Prize, 1935; Bank of Provinces (Municipalities) Architectural Design Competition, Honorable Mention 2, 1935

Emin Onat (December 20, 1908 – July 17, 1961) was a Turkish architect and former rector of Istanbul Technical University.

Onat was born in Istanbul in 1908. He entered Istanbul Technical University in 1926. Then, he was sent to Zurich Technical University. Onat was one of the architects of Anıtkabir, the mausoleum of Mustafa Kemal Atatürk. His architectural style was formed at ETH. Emin Onat learned to experiment, interpret and search for modernism from his teacher Otto R. Salvisberg, a well-known, experienced practicing architect. Despite getting under the Anıtkabir's shadow, he has a unique architectural style.

== Career ==
Onat's architectural talent blossomed at Zurich Technical University, where one of his fellow students was Otto Rudolf Salvisberg, who later went to become one of the best architects of his time. Onat completed his studies in Zurich and returned to Turkey in 1934. Within a year, he had become an assistant professor in the Department of Architecture at the School of Engineering. He held the post for a couple of years that were marked by strenuous relations with the other members of the faculty, owing to the novel methods of teaching Onat introduced. In 1944 Onat became the first dean of the newly established Faculty of Architecture at the Istanbul Technical University.

Onat rose further into the echelons of the architectural world in 1946, when he was given an honorary membership of the Royal Institute of British Architects (RIBA). In 1951 he became the Rector of the Istanbul Technical University, a post he held for two years. The Hannover Technical University awarded him an honorary doctorate in 1956. In 1957 he returned to the university. His return lasted only three years as on 21 October 1960 he and 147 faculty members were ousted from the university.

== Designs ==
Onat designed several impressive buildings during his career. These include the Istanbul Theatre and Conservatory, Istanbul Justice Palace (1949), Kavaklıdere Cenap, Presidential Secretariat in Cankaya and the General Directorate of Security. Onat had a predilection for local architectural elements. He fused traditional designs into his own designs, striving to attain organic unity. Onat's other designs are the Istanbul Lounges, Uludag Sanatorium, Bursa Governor's Mansion and IBM Headquarters in Istanbul.
