= Istanbul Technical University Süleyman Demirel Cultural Center =

ITU Suleyman Demirel Cultural Center
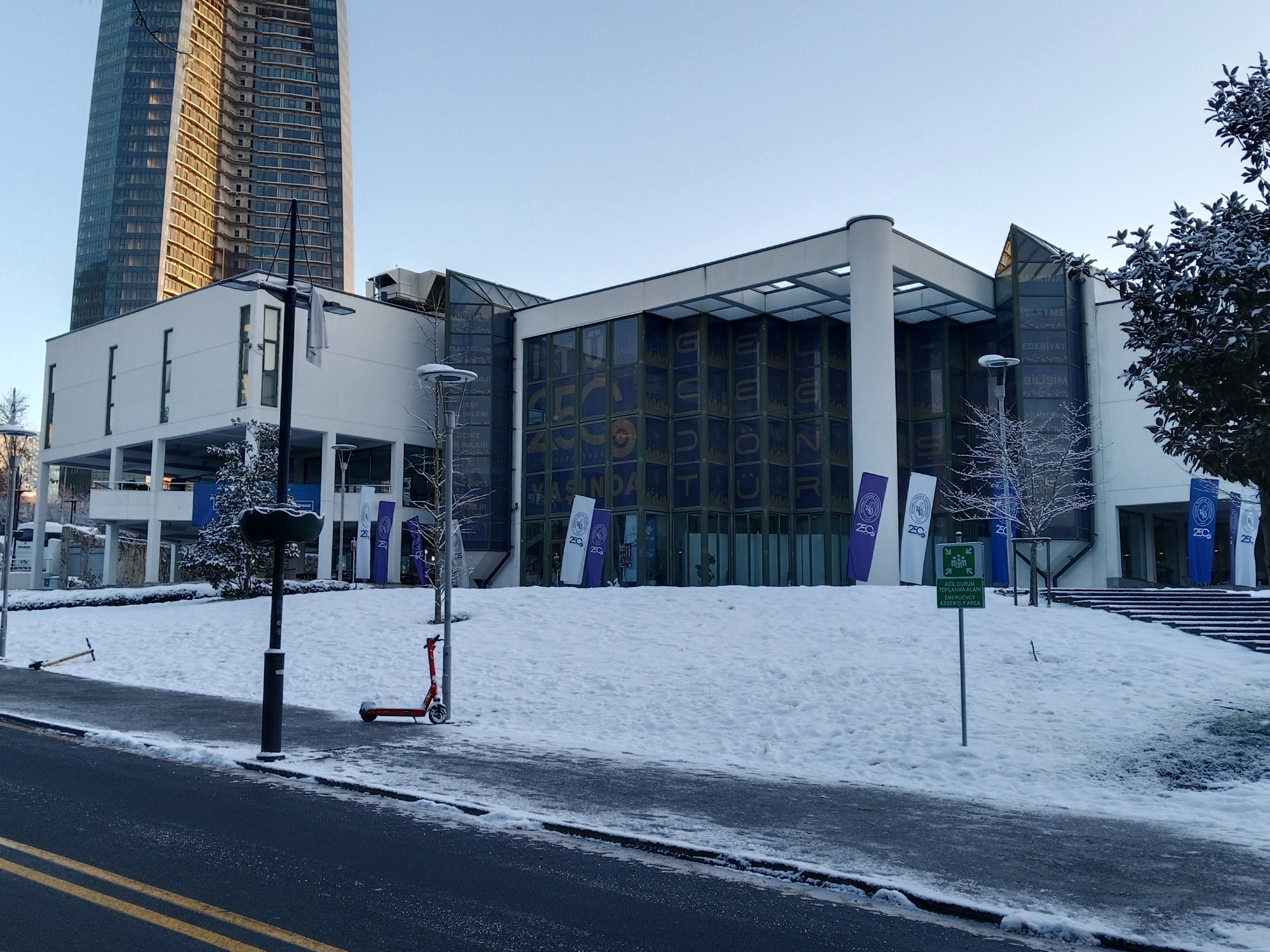
- Interactive map of the ITU Suleyman Demirel Cultural Center area

General information
- Type: Cultural and congress center
- Location: Istanbul, Turkey
- Coordinates: 41.10711°N 29.02303°E

The ITU Süleyman Demirel Cultural Center is a multi-venue building located within Istanbul Technical University's Ayazağa campus in Maslak, Istanbul. The university's academic and cultural activities are held in this center.
