= Rubin 9.2 =

Rubin 9.2 is a German experimental satellite payload launched on 23 September 2009 in 06:21 aboard PSLV-CA rocket at the Satish Dhawan Space Centre in India. Rubin 9.2 shares the host satellite Rubin-9 with another payload, Rubin 9.1. The Rubin-9 "satellite" (COSPAR 2009-051F) was actually the upper stage of the carrier rocket to which the payloads were solidly bolted onto; after the rocket had finished its mission with the primary payload, the upper stage remained in space and became "satellite" Rubin-9. Rubin 9.2 was developed by OHB System to continue their series of AIS receiver experiments that they had performed on previous Rubin-flights. AIS is a network used to find shipping vessels and identify them. Non-operational as of 2019, its orbit was 792 * 712 km, at 98°.
