= Istanbul Technical University Faculty of Electrical and Electronics Engineering =

ITU Faculty of Electrical and Electronics Engineering
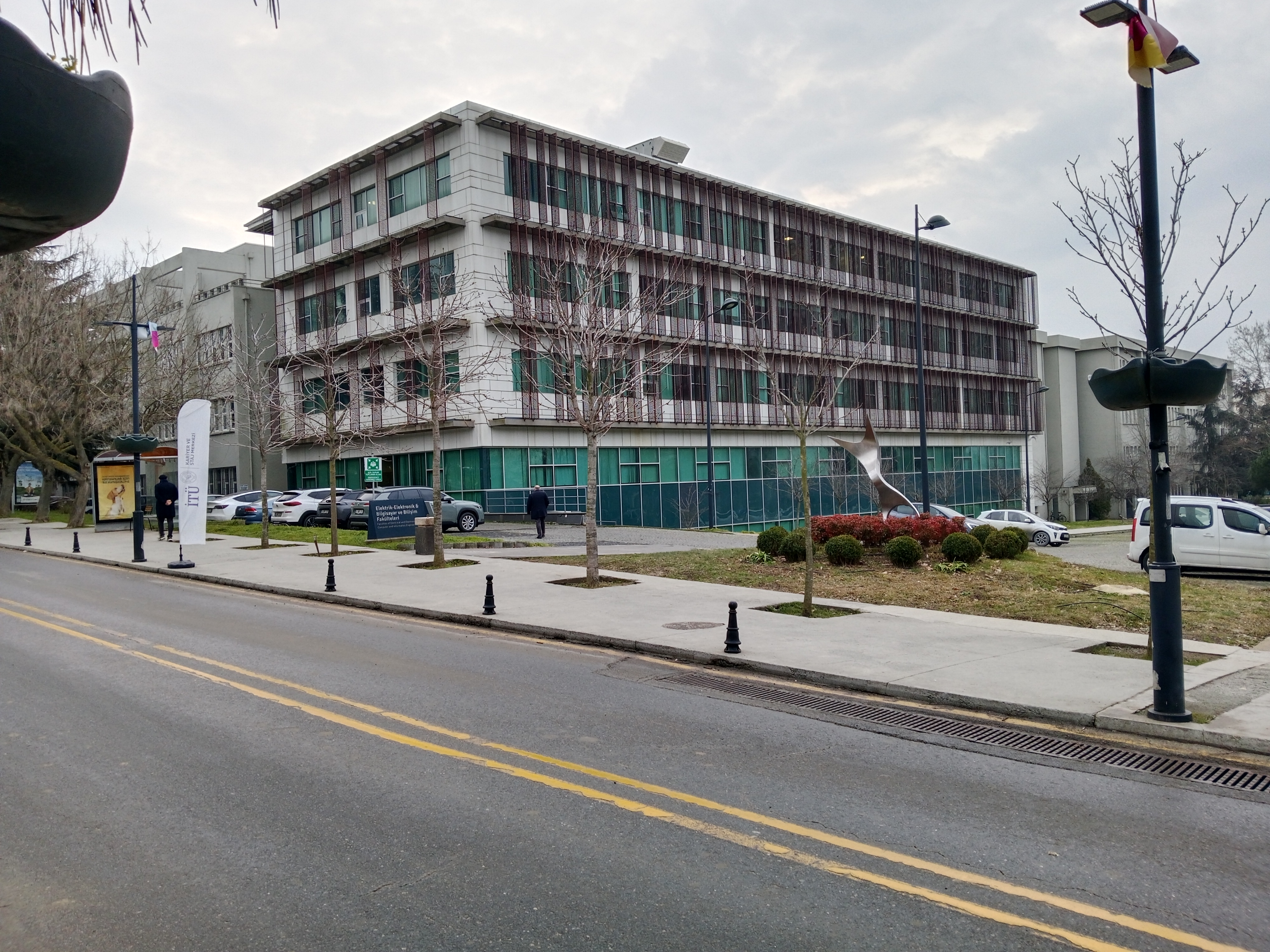
- Type: Public university
- Established: 1934, as Electro-Mechanic Division
- Location: Istanbul, Turkey
- Campus: Urban
- Website: www.ee.itu.edu.tr

ITU Faculty of Electrical and Electronics Engineering is a faculty of the Istanbul Technical University. In 1926, the “Institute of Mechanical and Electrical Engineering” was founded as part of the Science Faculty of Istanbul University (Istanbul Dar-ül Fünun). In 1934, the institute was bound to “Yüksek Mühendis Mektebi” (Advanced Vocational School for Engineering), today’s Istanbul Technical University, as the Electro-Mechanic Division, which was the start of Department of Electrical Engineering. The first students of this division graduated in 1936. Today, the faculty has three departments: Electrical engineering, electronics and communication engineering, robotics and autonomous systems engineering
