= UWE-2 =

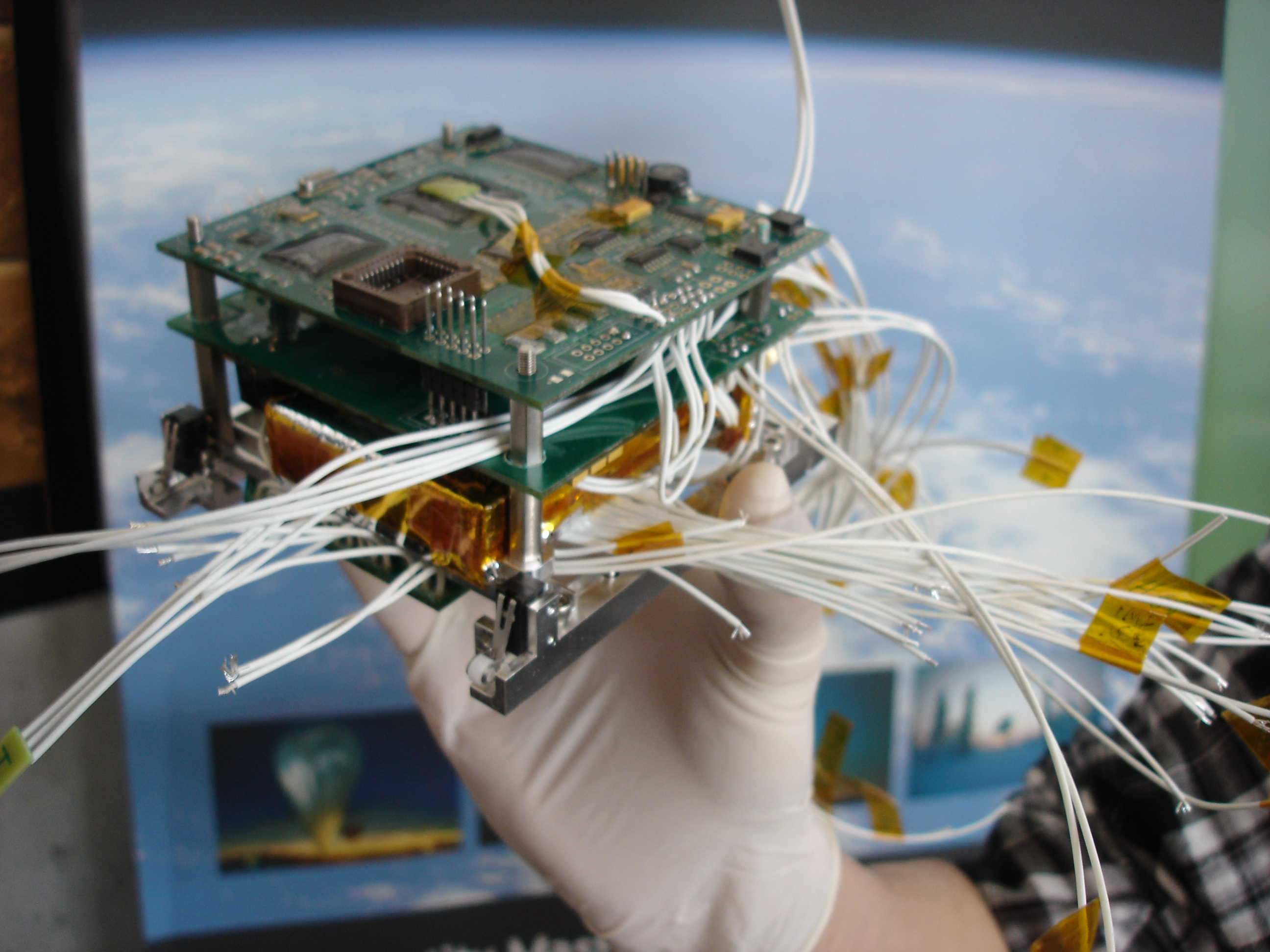
- UWE-2 satellite
- Names: Universität Würzburg's Experimentalsatellit-2
- Mission type: Technology demonstration
- Operator: University of Würzburg
- COSPAR ID: 2009-051D
- SATCAT no.: 35934
- Mission duration: 12 months (planned)

Spacecraft properties
- Spacecraft type: CubeSat
- Bus: 1U CubeSat
- Manufacturer: University of Würzburg
- Launch mass: 1 kg (2.2 lb)
- Dimensions: 10 × 10 × 10 cm (3.9 × 3.9 × 3.9 in)
- Power: 2 watts

Start of mission
- Launch date: 23 September 2009, 06:21 UTC
- Rocket: Polar Satellite Launch Vehicle PSLV-C14
- Launch site: Satish Dhawan Space Centre, First Launch Pad (FLP)
- Contractor: Indian Space Research Organisation
- Entered service: 23 September 2009

Orbital parameters
- Reference system: Geocentric orbit
- Regime: Sun-synchronous orbit
- Altitude: 720 km (450 mi)
- Inclination: 98.28°
- Period: 99.31 minutes
- UWE satellite Series

UWE-2 (University Würzburg's Experimental satellite 2) was a follow-on picosatellite technology demonstration project within the CubeSat family standard, developed and built by students of the University of Würzburg, Germany. The overall objective is to demonstrate the capabilities of attitude determination and control in picosatellites.

== Mission ==
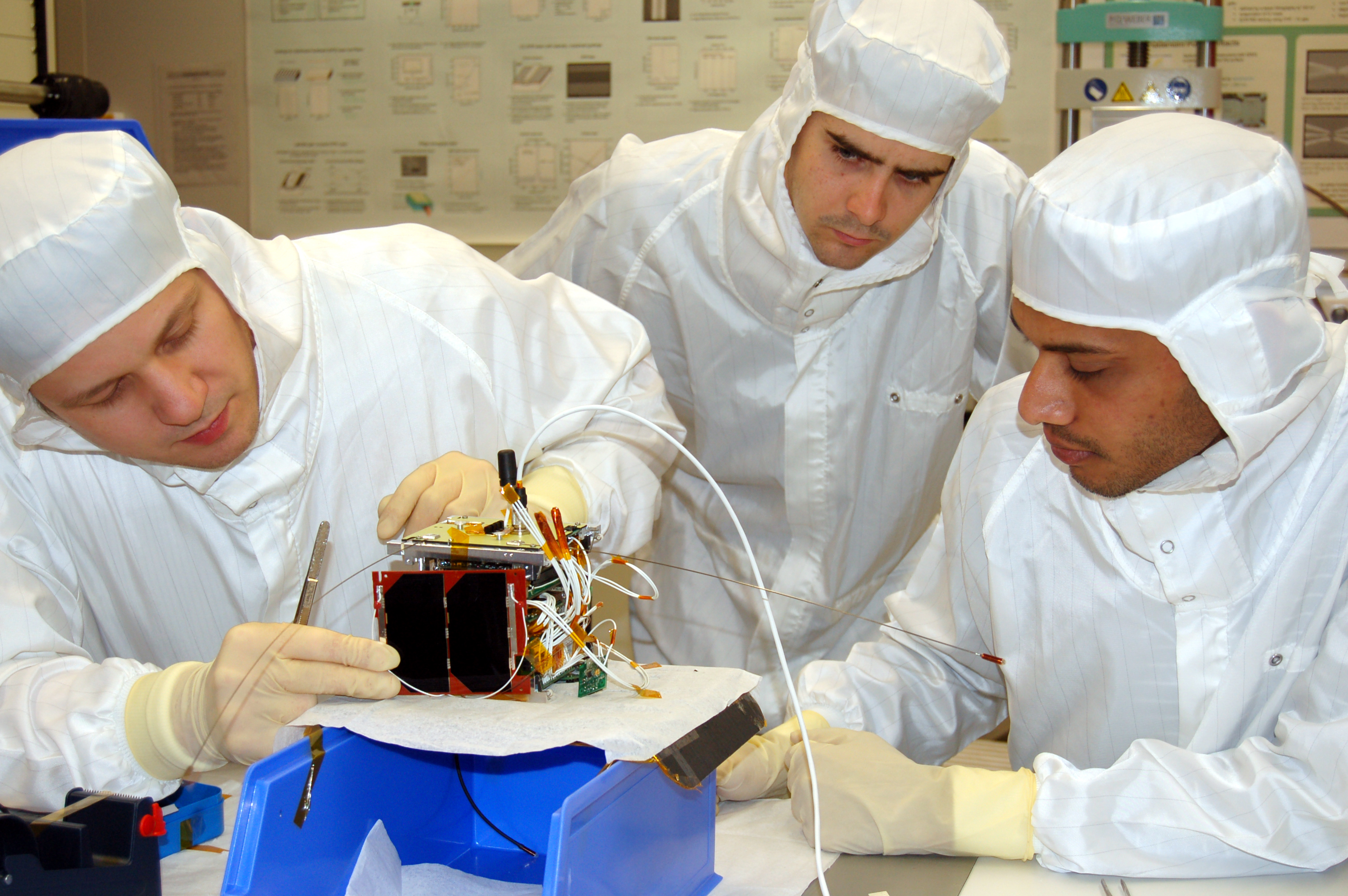
Integration of UWE-2 in the cleanroom

Developed by the University of Würzburg, its scientific objectives are:

- tests of methods and algorithms for attitude determination
- optimisation of internet protocol parameters, in order to adapt to the specific space environment.

== Launch ==
On 23 September 2009, at 06:21 UTC, UWE-2 was launched by a Polar Satellite Launch Vehicle (PSLV) launch vehicle (PSLV-C14) together with Oceansat-2 and three further CubeSats in a polar orbit at 720 km altitude. Successful operations could be initiated. Use of SPL (Single Picosatellite Launcher) of Astro und Feinwerktechnik Adlershof GmbH (Berlin), Germany, for the deployment of the CubeSats.

UWE-2 followed the earlier UWE-1. UWE-3 is also planned.

== See also ==
- List of CubeSats
