= Oceansat-2 =

Indian Earth observation satellite

- Oceansat-2 satellite stowed
- Names: OceanSat-2
- Mission type: Earth observation Oceanography
- Operator: ISRO
- COSPAR ID: 2009-051A
- SATCAT no.: 35931
- Website: https://www.isro.gov.in/
- Mission duration: 5 years (planned); 16 years, 9 months and 1 day (in progress)

Spacecraft properties
- Spacecraft: OceanSat-2
- Bus: Oceansat-1
- Manufacturer: Indian Space Research Organisation
- Launch mass: 970 kg (2,140 lb)
- Dimensions: 2.80 m x 1.98 m x 2.57 m
- Power: 1360 watts

Start of mission
- Launch date: 23 September 2009, 06:21 UTC
- Rocket: Polar Satellite Launch Vehicle, (PSLV-C14)
- Launch site: Satish Dhawan Space Centre, First Launch Pad (FLP)
- Contractor: Indian Space Research Organisation
- Entered service: 15 April 2010

Orbital parameters
- Reference system: Geocentric orbit
- Regime: Sun-synchronous orbit
- Perigee altitude: 728 km (452 mi)
- Apogee altitude: 731 km (454 mi)
- Inclination: 98.28°
- Period: 99.31 minutes

Instruments
- Ocean Colour Monitor-2 (OCM-2); Radio Occultation Sounder of the Atmosphere (ROSA); OceanSat Scatterometer (OSCAT)

Oceansat-2 is the second Indian satellite built primarily for ocean applications. It was a part of the Indian Remote Sensing Programme satellite series. Oceansat-2 is an Indian satellite designed to provide service continuity for operational users of the Ocean Colour Monitor (OCM) instrument on Oceansat-1. It will also enhance the potential of applications in other areas. The OceanSat-2 mission was approved by the government of India on 16 July 2005.

== Objectives ==
The mission objectives of Oceansat-2 are to gather systematic data for oceanographic, coastal and atmospheric applications. The main objectives of OceanSat-2 are to study surface winds and ocean surface strata, observation of chlorophyll concentrations, monitoring of phytoplankton blooms, study of atmospheric aerosols and suspended sediments in the water.

Oceansat-2 is second satellite in the series of Indian Remote Sensing satellites dedicated to ocean research, and will provide continuity to the applications of Oceansat-1 (launched in 1999). Oceansat-2 carried three instruments including an Ocean Colour Monitor (OCM-2), similar to the device carried on Oceansat-1. Data from all instruments are made available to the global scientific community after the post-launch sensor characterization, which is expected to be completed within 6 months of the launch.

Oceansat-2 carry three instruments for ocean-related studies, namely, Ocean Colour Monitor-2 (OCM-2), an OceanSat Scatterometer by Indian Space Research Organisation (ISRO), and an instrument called ROSA (Radio Occultation Sounder of the Atmosphere) developed by the Italian Space Agency (ASI). The major applications of data from Oceansat-2 are the identification of potential fishing zones, sea state forecasting, coastal zone studies, and inputs for weather forecasting and climatic studies.

== Instruments ==
The scientific payload contains three instruments. Two are Indian (ISRO) and one is from the Italian Space Agency (ASI).

- Ocean Colour Monitor-2 (OCM-2) is an 8-band multi-spectral camera operating in the Visible – Near-infrared spectroscopy spectral range. This camera provides an instantaneous geometric field of view of 360 metres (0.22 mi) and a swath of 1,420 kilometres (880 mi). OCM-2 can be tilted up to +20° along track.
- Radio Occultation Sounder of the Atmosphere (ROSA) is a new GPS occultation receiver provided by Italian Space Agency (ASI). The objective is to characterize the lower atmosphere and the ionosphere, opening the possibilities for the development of several scientific activities exploiting these new radio occultation data sets.
- OceanSat Scatterometer (OSCAT) is an active microwave device designed and developed at ISRO/SAC, Ahmedabad. It will be used to determine ocean surface level wind vectors through estimation of radar backscatter. The scatterometer system has a 1-metre (3 ft 3 in) parabolic dish antenna and a dual feed assembly to generate two pencil beams and is scanned at a rate of 20.5 rpm to cover the entire swath. The Ku-band pencil beam scatterometer is an active microwave radar operating at 13.515 GHz providing a ground resolution cell of size 50 by 50 kilometres (31 mi × 31 mi). It consists of a parabolic dish antenna of 1-metre (3 ft 3 in) diameter which is offset mounted with a cant angle of about 46° with respect to Earth viewing axis. This antenna is continuously rotated at 20.5 rpm using a scan mechanism with the scan axis along the yaw axis. By using two offset feeds at the focal plane of the antenna, two beams are generated which will conically scan the ground surface. The back scattered power in each beam from the ocean surface is measured to derive wind vector. It is an improved version of the one on Oceansat-1. The inner beam makes an incidence angle of 48.90° and the outer beam makes an incidence angle of 57.60° on the ground. It covers a continuous swath of 1,400 kilometres (870 mi) for inner beam and 1,840 kilometres (1,140 mi) for outer beam respectively. The inner and outer beams are configured in horizontal and vertical polarization respectively for both transmit and receive modes. The aim is to provide global ocean coverage and wind vector retrieval with a revisit time of 2 days.

== Launch ==
Oceansat-2 was launched from Satish Dhawan Space Centre, First Launch Pad (FLP) on 23 September 2009, at 06:21 UTC using the Polar Satellite Launch Vehicle (PSLV-C14). India successfully launched its 16th remote-sensing satellite Oceansat-2 and six nano European satellites in 1200 seconds. The 44.4-metre (146 ft) tall, 230 tonnes (230 long tons; 250 short tons) Indian launch vehicle Polar Satellite Launch Vehicle (PSLV) freed itself from the launch pad at the spaceport and lifted itself up, lugging the 970-kilogram (2,140 lb) Oceansat-2 and the six nano satellites all together weighing 20 kilograms (44 lb).

In copybook style, the launch vehicle first flung out Oceansat-2 at an altitude of 720 kilometres (450 mi) above the Earth in a Sun-synchronous orbit (SSO), followed by the four nano satellites – also called Cubesats – each weighing 1 kilogram (2.2 lb). The remaining two, each weighing 8 kilograms (18 lb), were attached to the fourth stage. Of the six nano satellites, four are from Germany, one is from Switzerland and one from Turkey. The seventh is a big one, India's Oceansat-2 weighing 970 kilograms (2,140 lb). Soon after the satellites were put into orbit, Indian Space Research Organisation's (ISRO) satellite tracking centres started monitoring them. This was the 16th PSLV mission.

== Mission ==
Oceansat-2 was successfully deployed to predict the landfall and mitigate the effects of Cyclone Phailin, in October 2013. The OceanSat Scatterometer (OSCAT) on Oceansat-2 has been dysfunctional since February 2014.

== See also ==
- Indian Remote Sensing satellite
- List of Indian satellites
- Oceanography
- Scatterometer
