= Istanbul Technical University =

Technical university in Istanbul, Turkey

Coordinates: 41°06′18″N 29°01′30″E

- İstanbul Teknik Üniversitesi
- Latin: Universitas Technica Istanbulensis
- Motto: Asırlardır Çağdaş
- Motto in English: Contemporary through the Ages
- Type: Public technical university
- Established: 1773; 253 years ago
- Founder: Mustafa III
- Affiliations: EUA, TIME, CESAER Association, EAIE ATHENS
- Rector: Hasan Mandal
- Faculty: 2,277; professor 547
- Students: 37,092
- Undergraduates: 25,470
- Postgraduates: 11,622
- Location: Istanbul, Turkey
- Campus: 4 urban, 1 suburban, 1 abroad
- Colors: Navy blue and honey yellow
- Sporting affiliations: Turkish Basketball Division II; ITU Hornets (American football); Ünilig Super League
- Mascot: Bee
- Website: www.itu.edu.tr/en

Istanbul Technical University, also known as Technical University of Istanbul (Turkish: İstanbul Teknik Üniversitesi, commonly referred to as İTÜ), is a public technical university located in Istanbul, Turkey. It is the world's third-oldest technical university dedicated to engineering and natural sciences as well as social sciences recently.

İTÜ is ranked 79th globally and first in Turkey in the field of Engineering and Technology, as well as 182nd globally and first in Turkey in the field of Natural Sciences, according to the QS World University Rankings for 2025. The university has 92 undergraduate programs and 188 graduate programs in 14 faculties, 277,160 m^{2} of laboratory space, and 12 research centers.

Graduates of ITU have received many TÜBİTAK science and TÜBA awards. ITU alumni have also become members of the academy of sciences in the United States, United Kingdom and Russia. The university's basketball team, İstanbul Teknik Üniversitesi B.K., is in the Turkish Basketball Super League.

== History ==
=== Ottoman Empire ===
Considered as the world's third institution of higher learning specifically dedicated to engineering education, Istanbul Technical University (ITU) has a long and distinguished history. ITU was founded in 1773 by Sultan Mustafa III, as an important institution in the Nizam-ı Cedid reforms, as the Imperial School of Naval Engineering (Ottoman Turkish: Mühendishâne-i Bahrî-i Hümâyun), in the Kasımpaşa quarter on the Golden Horn, originally dedicated to train ship builders and cartographers for the Ottoman Navy. In 1795 the Imperial School of Military Engineering (Ottoman Turkish: Mühendishâne-i Berrî-i Hümâyun) was established in the nearby Hasköy quarter on the Golden Horn, and the scope of the school was broadened to train technical military staff for the modernization of the Ottoman Army. In 1845 the engineering function of the school was further widened with the addition of a program devoted to the training of architects. The scope and name of the school were extended and changed again in 1883, and in 1909 the school became a public engineering school which was aimed at training civil engineers who could provide the infrastructure for the rapidly developing country.

=== Modern Turkey ===
By 1928 the institution had gained formal recognition as a university of engineering which provided education in both engineering and architecture. In 1944 the name of the institution was changed to Istanbul Technical University and in 1946 the institution became an autonomous university with architecture, civil, mechanical, and electrical engineering faculties.

With its long history of 251 years, its modern teaching environment, and well-qualified teaching staff, Istanbul Technical University today is the personification of engineering and architectural education in Turkey. Istanbul Technical University not only played a leading role in the modernization movement of the Ottoman Empire, but has also maintained its leadership position in the changes and innovations taking place in the construction, industrialization, and technological realms during the modern days of the Turkish Republic. Engineers and architects trained at Istanbul Technical University have played significant roles in the construction of Turkey. Alumni also played a significant role in Turkish politics.

== Academics ==
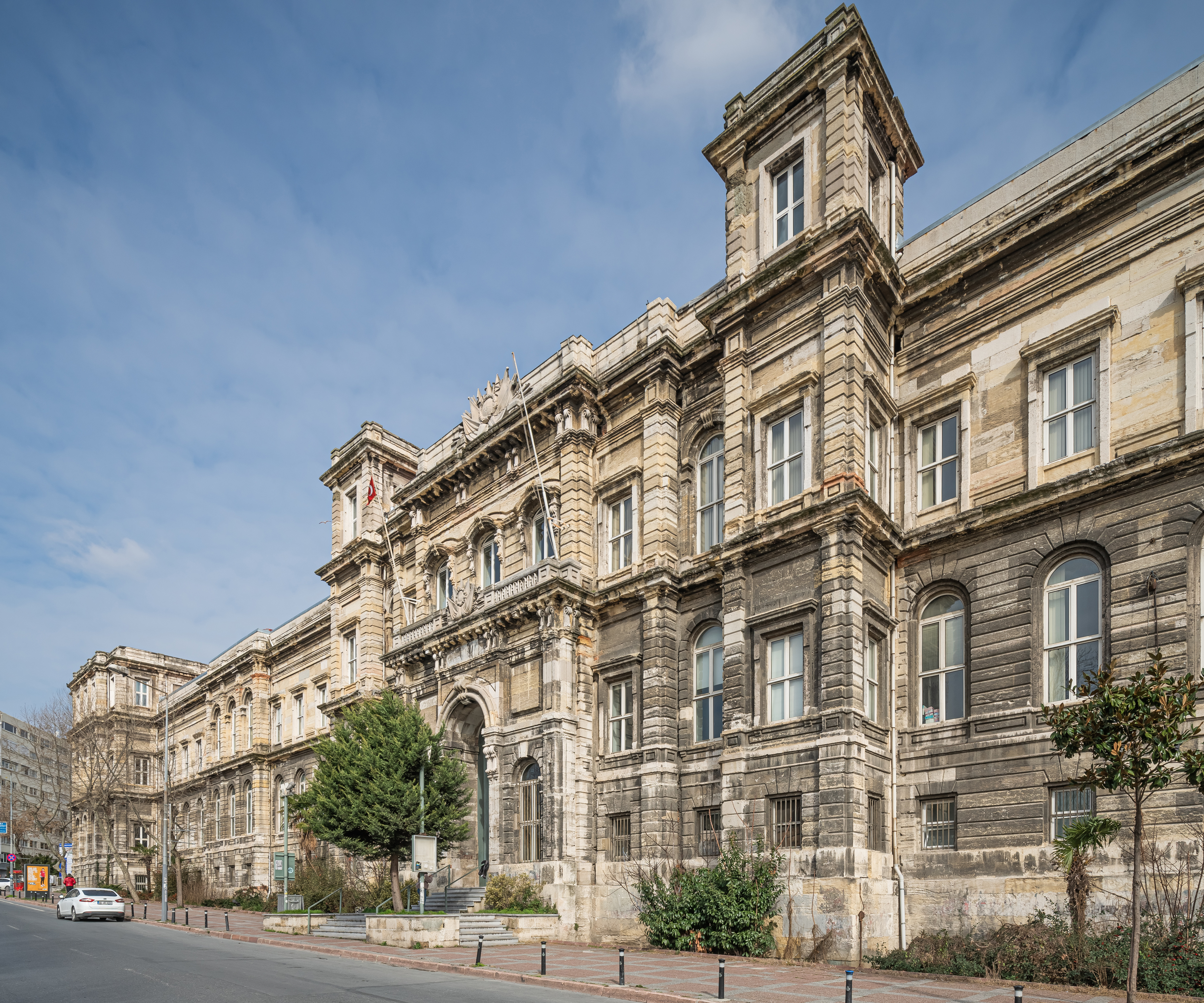
Maçka campus of Istanbul Technical University

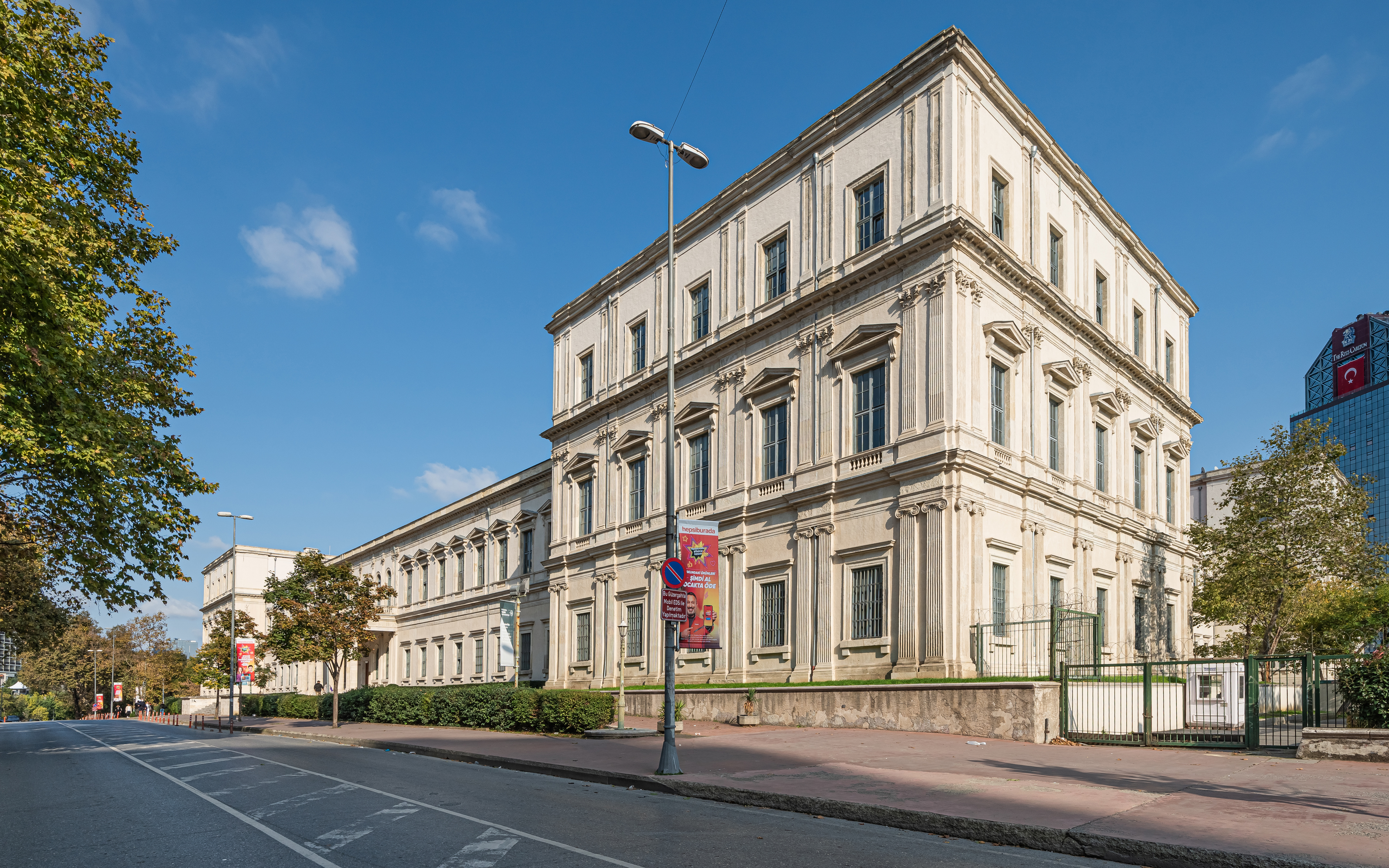
Taşkışla campus of Istanbul Technical University

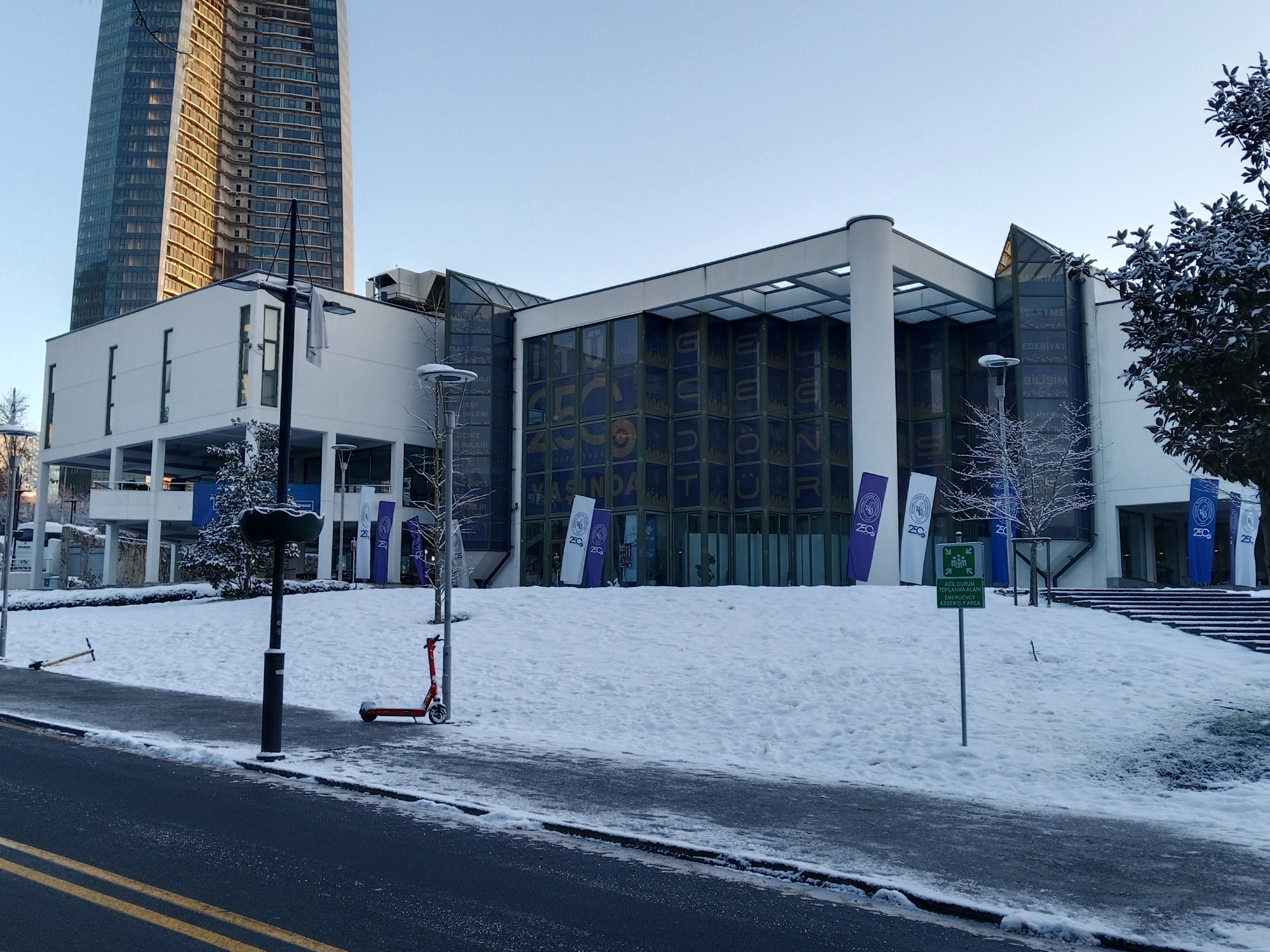
Süleyman Demirel Cultural Center at the Ayazağa campus of Istanbul Technical University

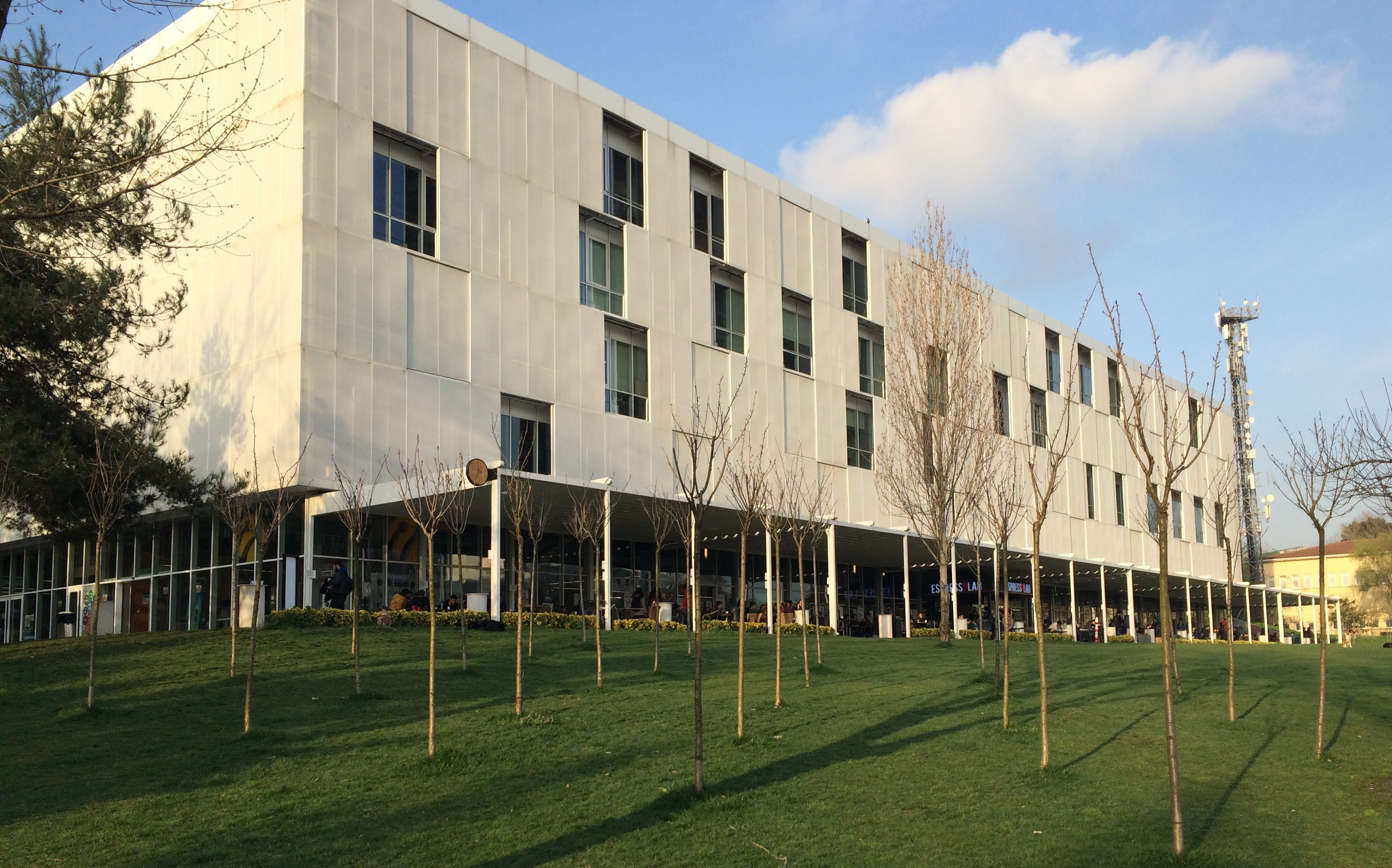
Lecture Hall at the Ayazağa campus of ITU

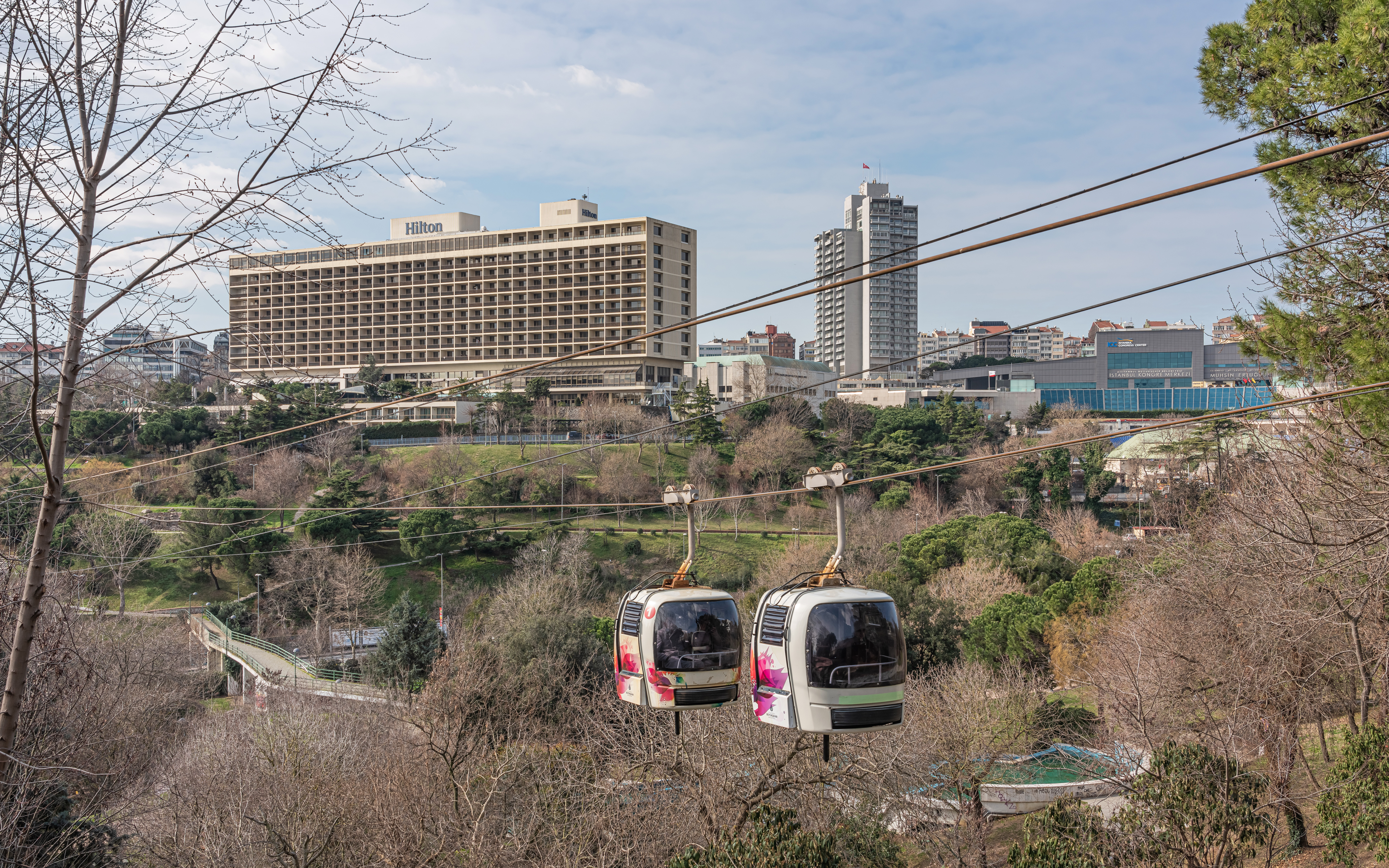
Sky Tram between the Maçka and Taşkışla Campuses of Istanbul Technical University

The structure of faculties, except the Faculty of Science and Letters, at ITU is comparable to those of "schools" in the U.S. institutions, where each faculty is composed of two or more departments in line with a comprehensive engineering field. For example, the Faculty of Electrical and Electronics Engineering consists of the departments of electrical engineering, robotics and autonomous systems engineering, electronics and communication engineering.

Faculty of Civil Engineering

- Civil Engineering
- Geomatics Engineering
- Environmental Engineering

Faculty of Architecture

- Architecture
- Urban and Regional Planning
- Industrial Design
- Interior Architecture
- Landscape Architecture

Faculty of Mechanical Engineering

- Mechanical Engineering

Faculty of Electrical and Electronics Engineering

- Electrical Engineering
- Robotics and Autonomous Systems Engineering
- Electronics and Communication Engineering

Faculty of Computer and Informatics

- Computer Engineering
- Artificial Intelligence and Data Engineering
- Cybersecurity Engineering
- Information Systems Engineering (Joint programme with SUNY)

Faculty of Mines

- Mining Engineering
- Mineral Processing Engineering
- Geological Engineering
- Petroleum and Natural Gas Engineering
- Geophysical Engineering

Faculty of Chemical and Metallurgical Engineering

- Chemical Engineering
- Metallurgical and Materials Engineering
- Food Engineering
- Bioengineering (DDP)

Faculty of Naval Architecture and Ocean Engineering

- Naval Architecture and Marine Engineering
- Shipbuilding and Ocean Engineering

Faculty of Sciences and Letters

- Mathematics Engineering
- Physics Engineering
- Chemistry
- Molecular Biology and Genetics

Faculty of Aeronautics and Astronautics

- Aeronautical Engineering
- Astronautical Engineering
- Climate Science and Meteorological Engineering

Faculty of Management

- Management Engineering
- Industrial Engineering
- Economics
- Data Science and Analytics

Maritime Faculty

- Marine Engineering
- Maritime Transportation and Management Engineering

Faculty of Textile Technologies and Design

- Textile Engineering
- Fashion Design
- Textile Development and Management

Cyber Security Vocational School

- Cyber Security Analyst and Operator

ITU TRNC Education and Research Campuses

- Computer Engineering
- Electrical-Electronics Engineering
- Industrial Engineering
- Economics and Finance
- Architecture
- Interior Architecture
- Maritime Business Management
- Maritime Transportation Management Engineering
- Marine Engineering
- Naval Architecture and Marine Engineering
- Preparatory School of Foreign Languages

=== Institutes and Research Centers ===
There are several Research Groups in ITU, including:

- Energy Institute
- Institute of Science and Technology
- Social Sciences Institute
- Institute of Informatics
- Eurasia Earth Sciences Institutes
- Molecular Biology, Biotechnology and Genetics Research Center (MOBGAM)
- ARI Technopolis
- Center for Satellite Communications and Remote Sensing
- National Center for High Performance Computing
- Rotorcraft Center of Excellence (ROTAM)
- Mechatronics Education And Research Center (MEAM)
- Center of Excellence for Disaster Management
- Prof.Dr. Adnan Tekin Materials Science and Production Technologies Applied Research Center (ATARC)
- Housing Research and Education Center
- Women's Studies Center in Science, Engineering and Technology

Planned Research Center Projects:

- Vehicle Technology Research Center
- Rf/Mixed Signal Processing Research Center
- Nanoscience and Nanotechnology Advanced Research Center

Finally, ITU also has the following departments / educational institutes that are not tied to any of the faculties, but serve as independent departments. These include

- School of Foreign Languages
- School of Fine Arts
- School of Athletic Education
- State Conservatory of Turkish Classical Music
- Advanced Musical Sciences Research Institute
- Polar Research Center

== International perspective and rankings ==
University rankings

Global – Overall
- ARWU World: 701-800 (2023)
- QS World: 298 (2026)
- QS Employability: 301-500 (2022)
- THE World: 501-600 (2024)

Global – Science and engineering
- QS Engineering & Tech.: 79 (2025)
- QS Natural Sciences: 182 (2025)

Regional – Overall
- QS Emerging Europe and Central Asia: 17 (2022)

26 engineering departments of ITU are accredited by Accreditation Board for Engineering and Technology (ABET). Also ITU's Faculty of Architecture is accredited by NAAB and the Faculty of Maritime is accredited by IMO. Minimum score of 72 from TOEFL IBT, or success in the English proficiency exam is one of the prerequisites to register the Bachelor, Master, or Doctorate level courses at ITU. Instruction is offered in both English and Turkish, with approximately 30% of courses conducted in English and 70% in Turkish, while some disciplines are taught entirely in English. Master and Doctorate courses are mostly held in English. ITU is highly reputable institution in the area of engineering sciences within the Europe. Therefore, the university provides a broad range of options, that involve highly reputable institutions, to its students for the Erasmus Mobility.

University rankings
	2025	2024	2023	2022	2021	2020	2019	2018
QS World Rankings	326	404	601-650	701-750	751-800	651-700	651-700	601-650
QS Engineering & Technology	79	95	108	142	202	218	256	231
QS Natural Sciences	182	275	255	303	305	324	342	311
THE World Rankings	501-600	501-600	601-800	601-800	801-1000	601-800	601-800	601-800
THE Engineering & Technology	301-400	301-400	401-500	401-500	501-600	501-600	401-500	401-500

Istanbul Technical University is consistently featured as one of the highest-ranked universities in Turkey. In the QS World University Rankings 2023, ITU is ranked within the top 150 universities in the subject areas "Engineering - Petroleum", "Engineering - Mineral & Mining", "Engineering - Civil and Structural", "Engineering - Electrical and Electronics", "Engineering - Mechanical, Aeronautical & Manufacturing", within the top 250 in "Engineering - Chemical", "Architecture & Built Environment", "Computer Science and Information Systems", "Material Sciences", within the top 300 in "Environmental Sciences", "Mathematics", "Business and Management", "Chemistry", and within the top 450 in "Physics and Astronomy", "Economics and Econometrics.

== Campus ==
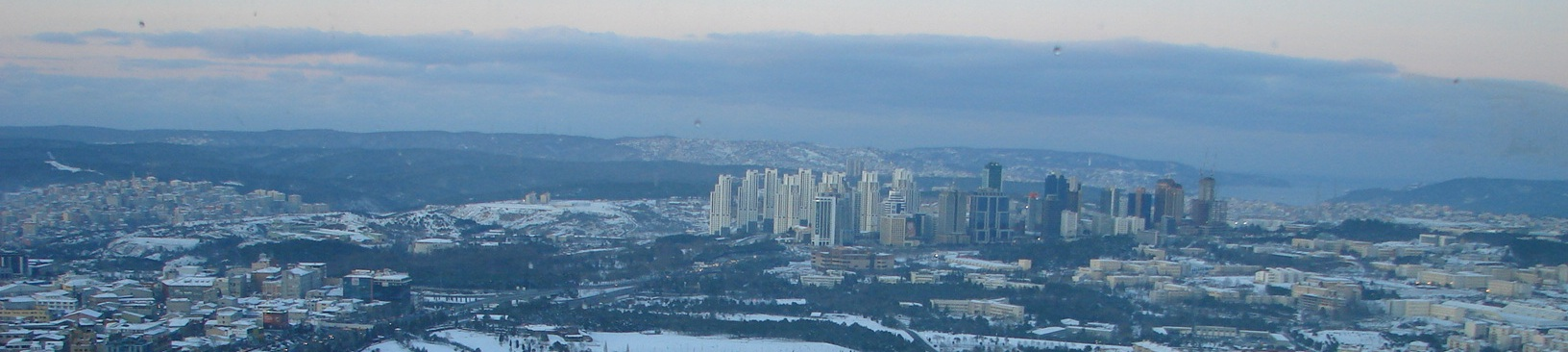
Maslak skyline and the ITU Ayazağa Campus to its right

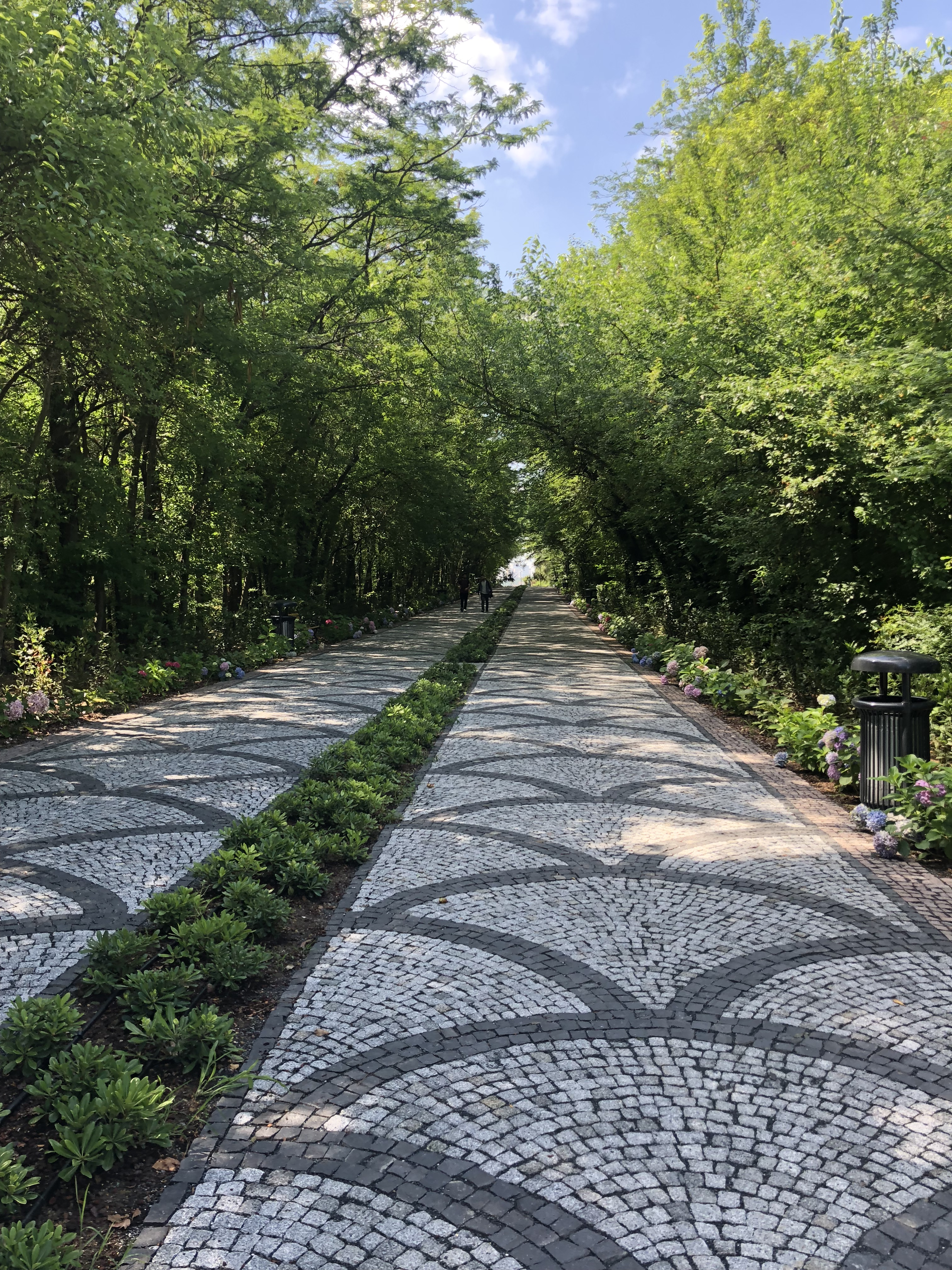
Ayazağa Campus

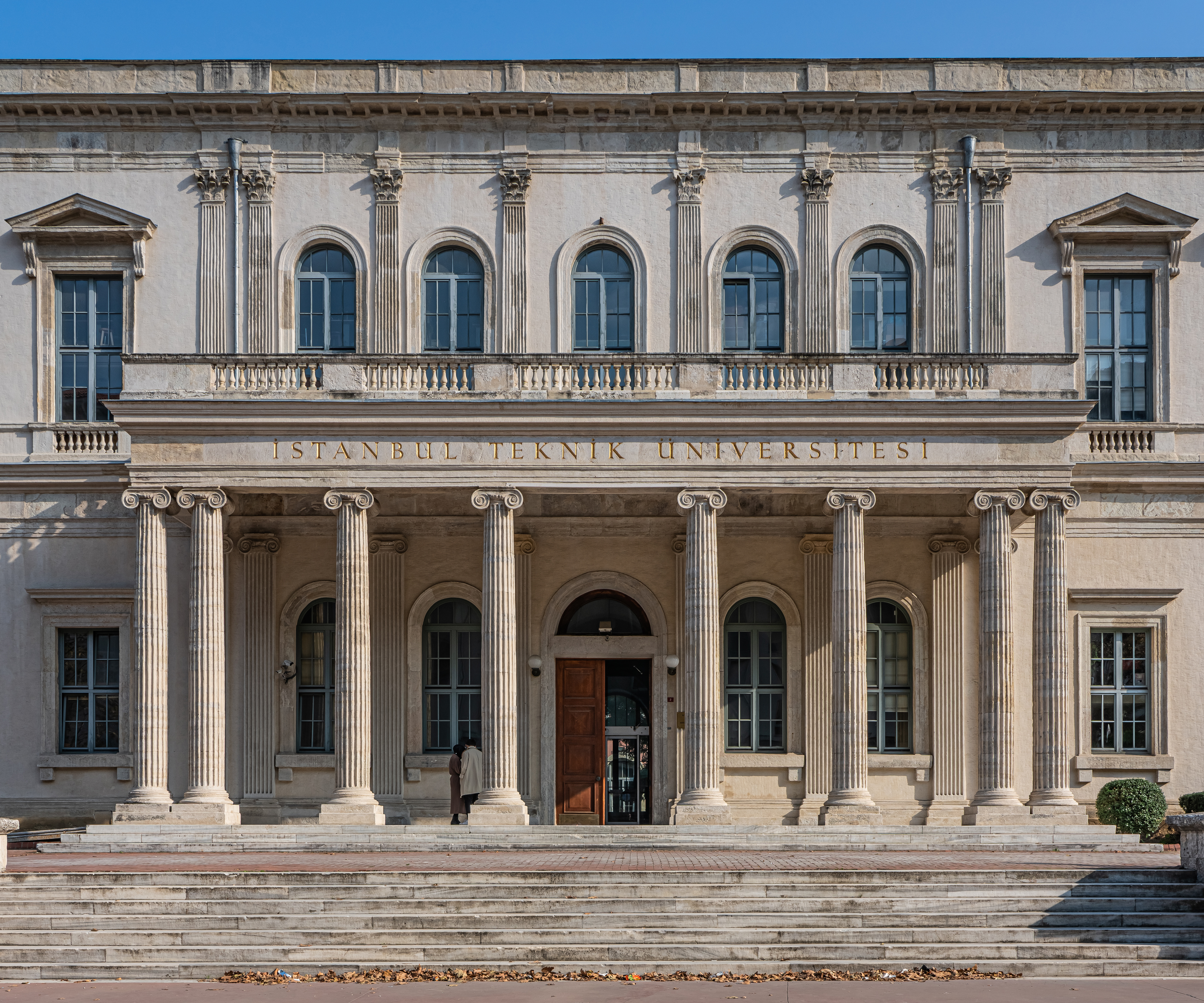
ITU Taşkışla Campus

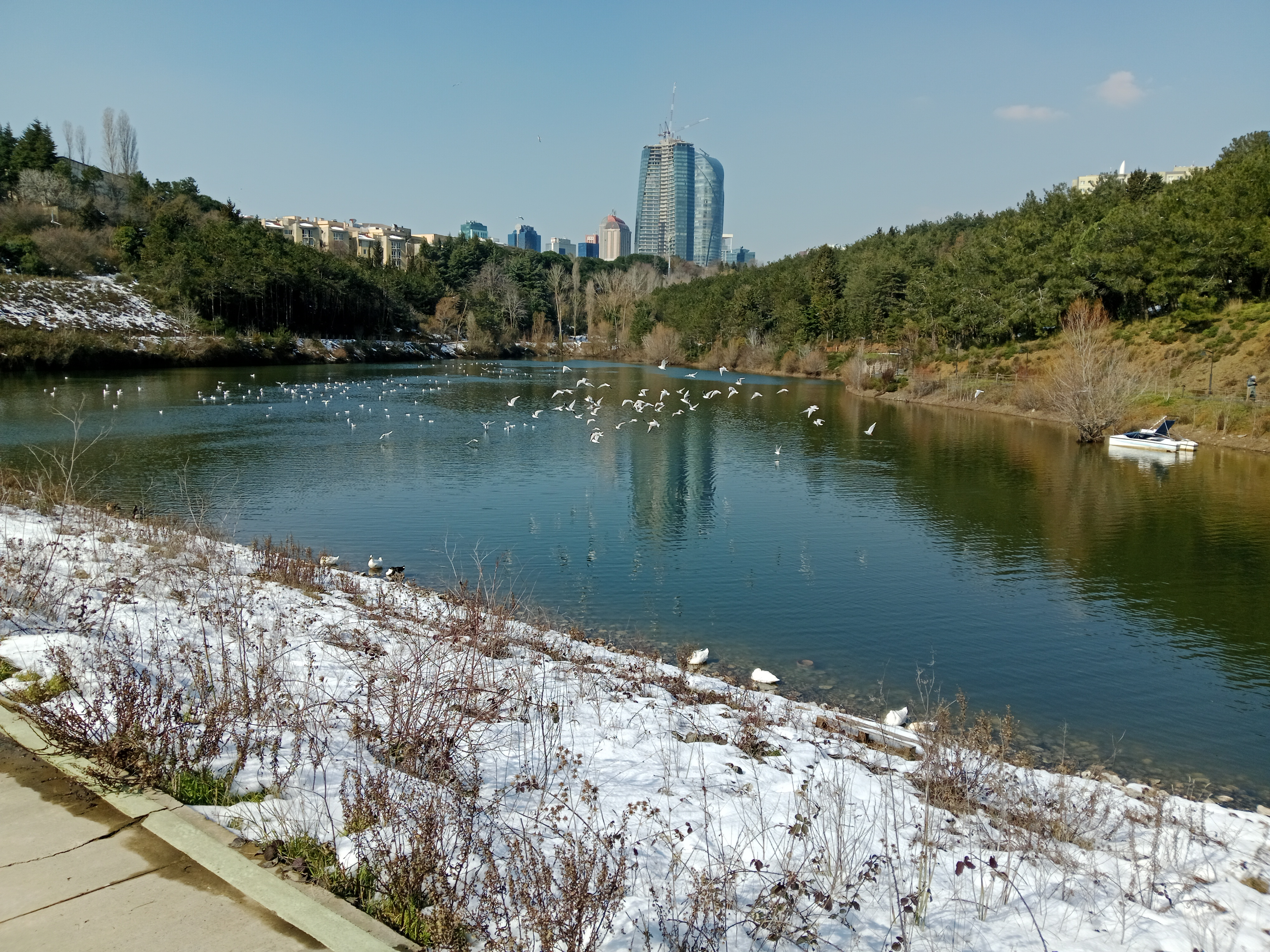
ITU Lake in Ayazağa Campus

ITU is a public university. It has six campuses, five of which are located in the most important areas of Istanbul and one is located in Famagusta. Among ITU's six campuses, the main campus of Maslak, in Sarıyer, is a suburban campus, covering a total area of 1.600.000 m². The University Rectorate, swimming pool, stadium, along with most of the faculties, student residence halls and the central library of ITU are located there.

Another suburban campus of ITU is the Tuzla Campus. It serves the Maritime Faculty students and faculty members. It is located in the Tuzla district of Istanbul, which is a dockyard area.

The three urban campuses are near to one another and are situated close to Taksim Square.

Taşkışla campus is where the Faculty of Architecture is located. The Taşkışla building is one of the most renowned historical buildings in Istanbul. It dates backs to the Ottoman era and was used as military barracks.

The Gümüşsuyu campus, home to the Faculty of Mechanical Engineering, and the Maçka campus, housing the Faculty of Management, are both located in historically significant buildings in Istanbul.

The Famagusta campus at Northern Cyprus is currently the first and only campus that hosts the ITU TRNC Education and Research Campuses faculty.

=== Library Services ===
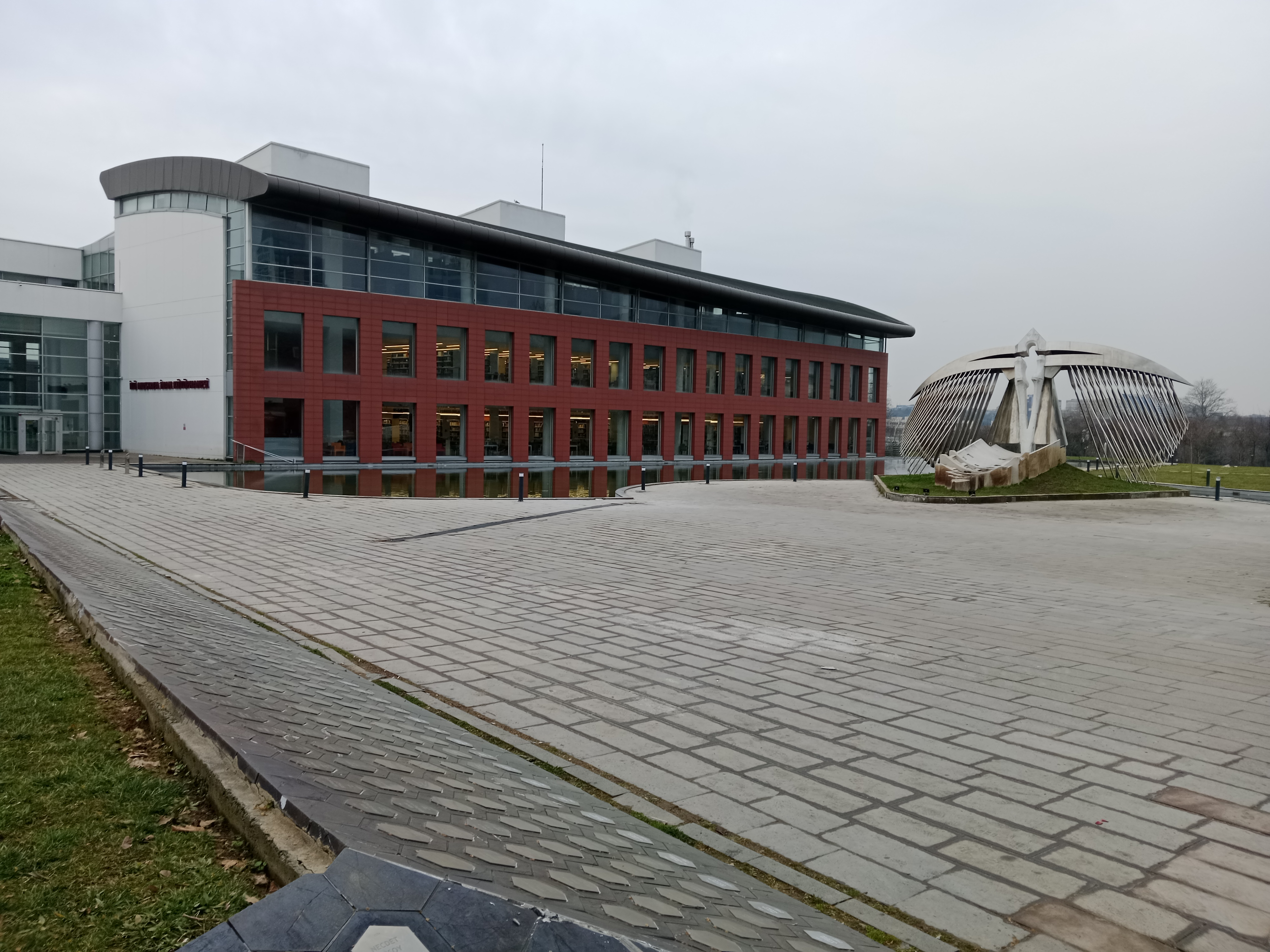
ITU Mustafa Inan Library

The library at ITU houses approximately 533,000 books, 500,000 volumes of periodicals, and 6,000 rare Ottoman and Latin books. ITU Library has access to international libraries and online databases and boasts the largest collection of technical materials in Turkey, particularly in science and engineering. The Mustafa Inan Library, named after Mustafa İnan, a former rector of the university, serves as the central library and coordination center for the university's library services. The history of ITU Library Services dates back to 1795, originating from the printing house of the Mühendishâne-i Berrî-i Hümâyun of the Ottoman Empire.

=== Triga Mark-2 Nuclear Reactor ===
ITU's nuclear reactor of Triga Mark-2 is in the Maslak campus. It is located at the Energy Institute.

=== Arı Technopolis ===
Since the foundation in 2003 Arı Technopolis, which is located at the Ayazağa Campus, provides companies with research, technology development and production opportunities at the university, in cooperation with the researchers and academicians. The technopolis have two buildings:Arı-1 and Arı-2. Arı-3 building in Maslak and another building in Floria are announced to build. Arı Technopolis has the 49% of export among technopolises in Turkey.

=== National High Performance Computing Center ===
NHPCC, is located in the Ayazağa Campus. It is the national center for high performance computing. The super computer of this center was one of the world's top 500 list super computers (240th).

== Student life ==
=== Athletics ===
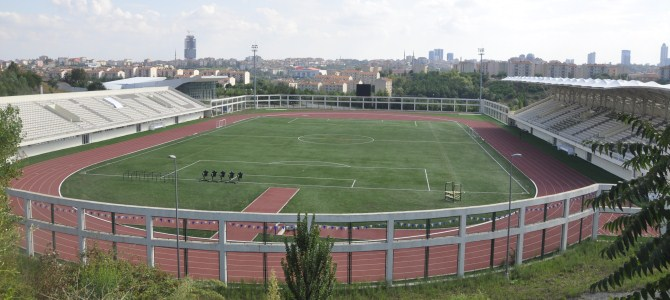
ITU Stadium at the Ayazağa campus is home to the university's football, American football and athletics teams, and also hosts numerous concerts.

Having a suburban campus like Maslak has created the opportunity of building many sports areas. Ayazağa Gymnasium is the center of sports in ITU. Ayazağa Gymnasium also has a stadium with a seating capacity of 3500 for basketball and volleyball matches. A fitness center is also located there.

Basketball matches are among the most important sports activities in ITU. The ITU basketball Team, which won the Turkish Basketball League Championship five times, currently plays in the Turkish Basketball League's Second Division (TB2L). Ayazağa Gymnasium is the home of the ITU Basketball Team.

Despite the successes in basketball, the football team of ITU plays in the amateur league. A football stadium is also located in Ayazağa, where the football team plays its matches.

Tennis courts and an indoor Olympic swimming pool, which is opened in May 2007, are also available in the Ayazağa Campus. An open-air swimming pool serves the ITU faculties.

ITU's American football team ITU Hornets has won the Unilig (Turkish University Sports Leagues) Super League of American football in the 2013-2014 season and in 2014-2015 season.

Other sports clubs and activities in ITU are badminton, ultimate, fencing, diving, winter sports, dancing and gymnastics, tennis, paintball, aikido, athletics, mountaineering, bridge, swimming, cycling and triathlon, skiing, parachuting, korfball, handball, iaido, capoeira, wrestling, archery, ultimate frisbee and sailing.

=== Social life ===
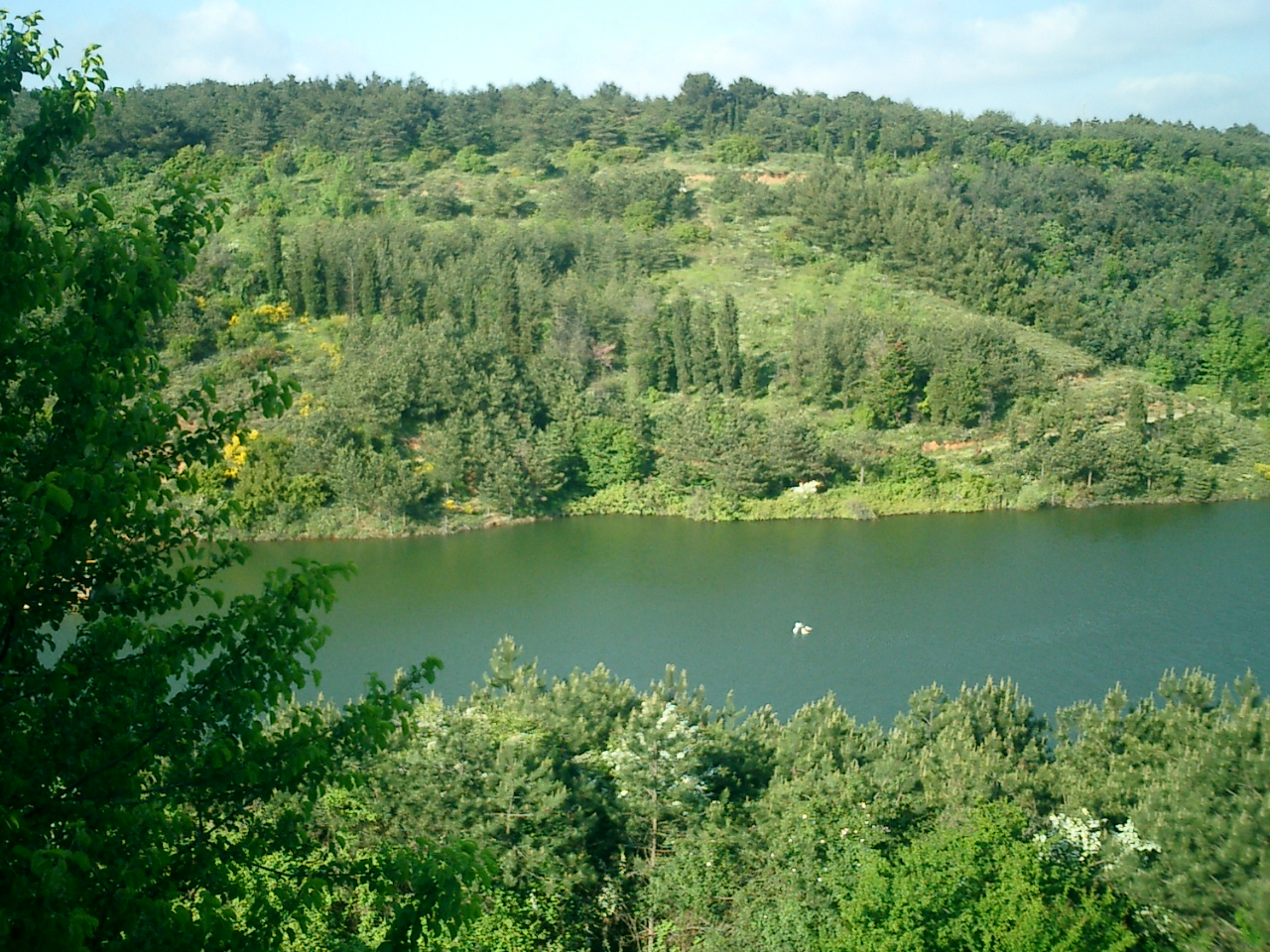
ITU Lake at the Ayazağa campus

ITU offers many options to students who like doing extra-curricular work during their studying years. The most popular ones are Rock Club, Cinema Club, Model United Nations, EPGIK, International Engineering Club. Also ITU has an option for those who like to organise events and socialise with people from various European countries in the Local Board of European Students of Technology Group which had 40 members in 2007. Despite all these, it can still be a little quiet in the campus from time to time because students can choose the city of Istanbul over the campus life.

==== ITU Model United Nations (ITUMUN) ====
Model United Nations Society of ITU is one of the most active student clubs in the University. Participating in MUN conferences regularly, both domestic and international, MUN society offers an opportunity for personal development.

Model United Nations is a conference where students participate as United Nations delegates. Participants research and formulate political positions based on the actual policies of the countries they represent.

=== Housing ===
ITU dormitories have a capacity of 3,000 students. They include Lakeside Housings, IMKB Dormitory, Verda Urundul, Ayazağa Dormitory and Gumussuyu dormitory.

=== Radio ITU ===
Radio ITU (or Technical University Radio) is the first university radio station in Turkey. Radio ITU is located in the School of Electrical and Electronics Engineering building on Maslak campus.

=== Entertainment ===
ITU Stadium is one of the most popular locations in Istanbul for concerts and such those performances.

For instance, Metallica (in 2014), Justin Timberlake (in 2014), and Roger Waters (in 2013) gave concerts at the ITU stadium. Lady Gaga also performed at the stadium on September 16, 2014 to a sold-out crowd of 25,157 people as part of her artRAVE: The ARTPOP Ball.

== Notable faculty ==
- Cahit Arf — Turkish mathematician
- Fatih Birol — Executive director of the International Energy Agency
- Aykut Barka — Turkish geologist
- Rudolf Belling — German sculptor
- Nihat Berker — Turkish physicist
- Kerim Erim — Turkish mathematician and physicist
- Bülent Evcil — Turkish flutist
- İştar Gözaydın — Turkish political scientist
- Mustafa İnan - Turkish civil engineer
- İhsan Ketin — Turkish geologist
- Kazim Cecen — Hydraulic engineer
- Emin Halid Onat — Turkish architect
- Erdoğan Şuhubi — Turkish mathematician
- Karl von Terzaghi — Austrian civil engineer, founder of soil mechanics
- Celâl Şengör — Turkish geologist

== Notable alumni ==
Many of the graduates take role in the development of Turkey, with many of them playing significant roles in constructing bridges, roads and buildings. For instance, Emin Halid Onat and Ahmet Orhan Arda are architects of Anıtkabir. Süleyman Demirel (in Civil Engineering) and Turgut Özal (in Electrical Engineering) are the two former presidents of Turkey. Necmettin Erbakan (in Mechanical Engineering) and Binali Yıldırım (in Naval Architecture and Ocean Engineering) were former prime ministers of Turkey.

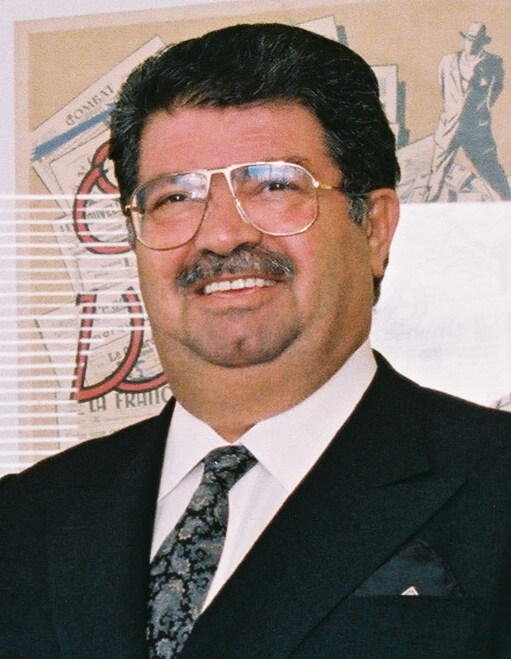
Turgut Özal, 8th president of Turkey

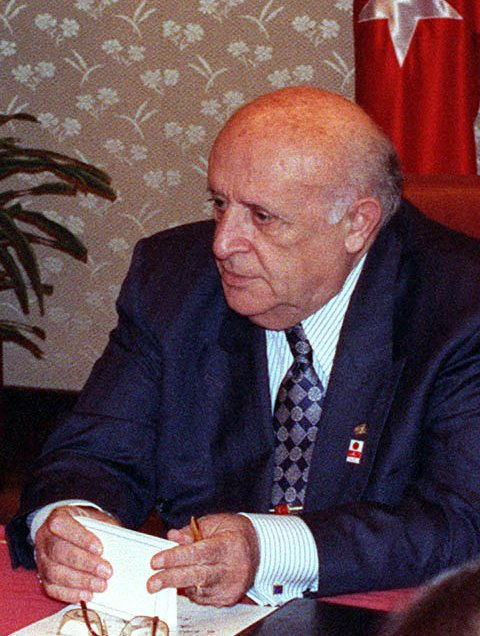
Süleyman Demirel, 9th president of Turkey

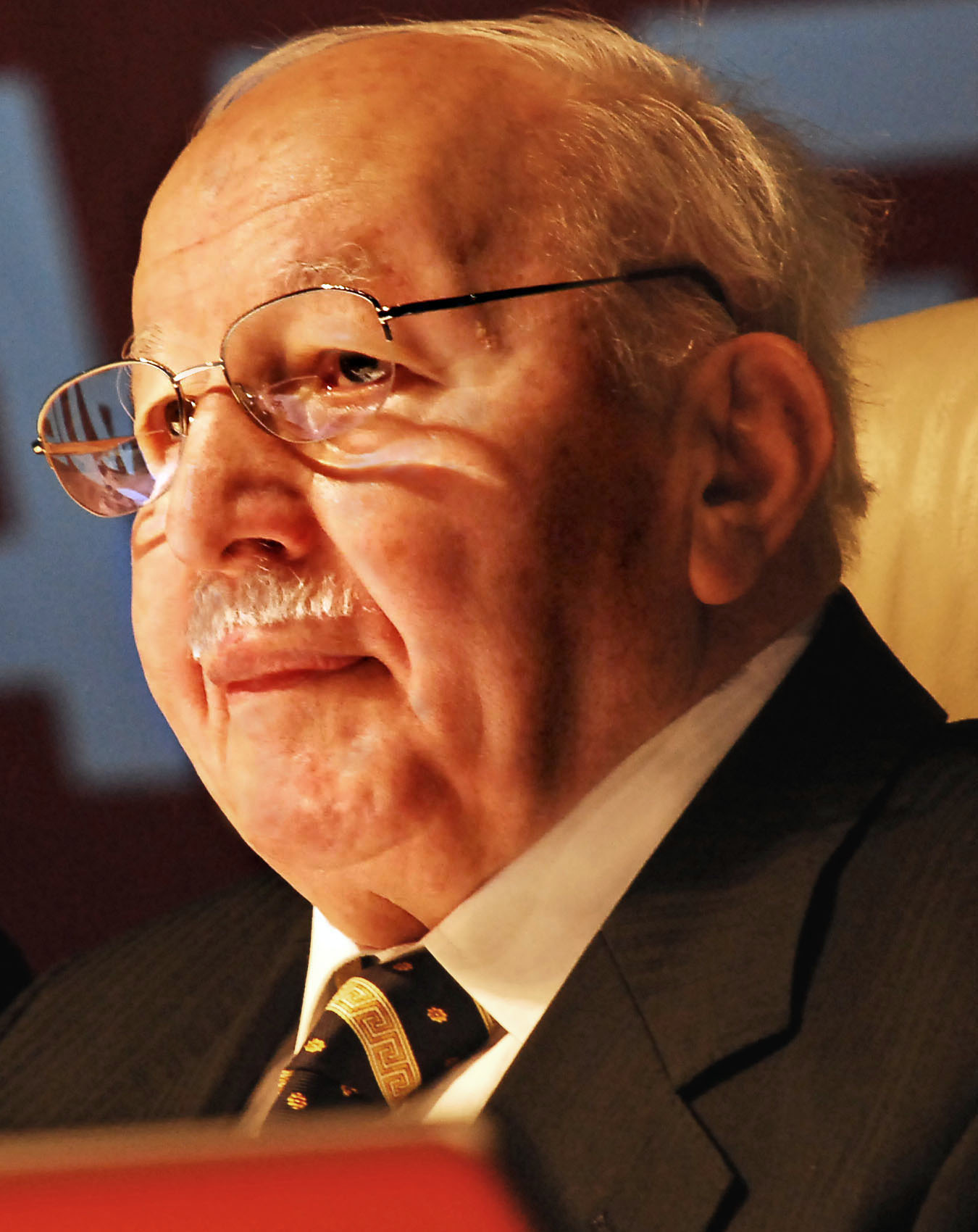
Necmettin Erbakan, 23rd prime minister of Turkey

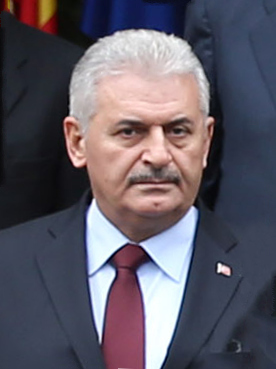
Binali Yıldırım, 27th prime minister of Turkey

== See also ==
- Technical university
- Turkish universities
- Top Industrial Managers for Europe (TIME) Network of Technology Universities
- ITUpSAT1, First Turkish university satellite
- CESAER Association
- Education in the Ottoman Empire
