= Indian Remote Sensing Programme =

Series of Earth observation satellites

India's remote sensing program was developed with the idea of applying space technologies for the benefit of humankind and the development of the country. The program involved the development of three principal capabilities. The first was to design, build and launch satellites to a Sun-synchronous orbit. The second was to establish and operate ground stations for spacecraft control, data transfer along with data processing and archival. The third was to use the data obtained for various applications on the ground.

India demonstrated the ability of remote sensing for societal application by detecting coconut root-wilt disease from a helicopter mounted multispectral camera in 1970. This was followed by flying two experimental satellites, Bhaskara-1 in 1979 and Bhaskara-2 in 1981. These satellites carried optical and microwave payloads.

India's remote sensing programme under ISRO started off in 1988 with the IRS-1A, the first of the series of indigenous state-of-art operating remote sensing satellites, which was successfully launched into a polar Sun-synchronous orbit on March 17, 1988, from the Soviet Cosmodrome at Baikonur.

It has sensors like LISS-I which had a spatial resolution of 72.5 metres (238 ft) with a swath of 148 kilometres (92 mi) on ground. LISS-II had two separate imaging sensors, LISS-II A and LISS-II B, with spatial resolution of 36.25 metres (118.9 ft) each and mounted on the spacecraft in such a way to provide a composite swath of 146.98 kilometres (91.33 mi) on ground. These tools quickly enabled India to map, monitor and manage its natural resources at various spatial resolutions. The operational availability of data products to the user organisations further strengthened the relevance of remote sensing applications and management in the country.

== IRS System ==
Following the successful demonstration flights of Bhaskara-1 and Bhaskara-2 satellites launched in 1979 and 1981, respectively, India began to develop the indigenous Indian Remote Sensing (IRS) satellite program to support the national economy in the areas of agriculture, water resources, forestry and ecology, geology, water sheds, marine fisheries and coastal management.

Towards this end, India had established the National Natural Resources Management System (NNRMS) for which the Department of Space (DOS) is the nodal agency, providing operational remote sensing data services. Data from the IRS satellites is received and disseminated by several countries all over the world. With the advent of high-resolution satellites, new applications in the areas of urban sprawl, infrastructure planning and other large scale applications for mapping have been initiated.

The IRS system is the largest constellation of remote sensing satellites for civilian use in operation today in the world, with 11 operational satellites. All these are placed in polar Sun-synchronous orbit and provide data in a variety of spatial, spectral and temporal resolutions. Indian Remote Sensing Programme completed its 25 years of successful operations on March 17, 2013.

== IRS data applications ==
Data from Indian Remote Sensing satellites are used for various applications of resources survey and management under the National Natural Resources Management System (NNRMS). Following is the list of those applications:

- Space Based Inputs for Decentralized Planning (SIS-DP)
- National Urban Information System (NUIS)
- ISRO Disaster Management Support Programme (ISRO-DMSP)
- Biodiversity characterizations at landscape level - http://bis.iirs.gov.in
- Preharvest crop area and production estimation of major crops.
- Drought monitoring and assessment based on vegetation condition.
- Flood risk zone mapping and flood damage assessment.
- Hydro-geomorphological maps for locating underground water resources for drilling well.
- Irrigation command area status monitoring
- Snow-melt run-off estimates for planning water use in down stream projects
- Land use and land cover mapping
- Urban planning
- Forest survey
- Wetland mapping
- Environmental impact analysis
- Mineral prospecting
- Coastal studies
- Integrated Mission for Sustainable Development (initiated in 1992) for generating locale-specific prescriptions for integrated land and water resources development in 174 districts.
- North Eastern District Resources Plan (NEDRP)

== IRS launch log ==
The initial versions are composed of the 1 (A, B, C, D). The later versions are named based on their area of application, including OceanSat, CartoSat, ResourceSat. Some of the satellites have alternate designations based on the launch number and vehicle (P series for PSLV). From 2020, the name was changed to the generic EOS, which stands for Earth Observation Satellite.

Serial No.	Satellite	Date of Launch	Launch Vehicle	Status
1	IRS-1A	17 March 1988	Vostok, USSR	Mission Completed
2	IRS-1B	29 August 1991	Vostok, USSR	Mission Completed
3	IRS-P1 (also IE)	20 September 1993	PSLV-D1	Launch failure
4	IRS-P2	15 October 1994	PSLV-D2	Mission Completed
5	IRS-1C	28 December 1995	Molniya, Russia	Mission Completed
6	IRS-P3	21 March 1996	PSLV-D3	Mission Completed
7	IRS 1D	29 September 1997	PSLV-C1	Mission Completed
8	IRS-P4 (Oceansat-1)	27 May 1999	PSLV-C2	Mission Completed
9	Technology Experiment Satellite (TES)	22 October 2001	PSLV-C3	Mission Completed
10	IRS P6 (Resourcesat-1)	17 October 2003	PSLV-C5	Mission Completed
11	IRS P5 (Cartosat 1)	5 May 2005	PSLV-C6	Mission Completed
12	IRS P7 (Cartosat 2)	10 January 2007	PSLV-C7	Mission Completed
13	Cartosat 2A	28 April 2008	PSLV-C9	In Service
14	IMS 1	28 April 2008	PSLV-C9	Mission Completed
15	RISAT-2	20 April 2009	PSLV-C12	In Service
16	Oceansat-2	23 September 2009	PSLV-C14	In Service
17	Cartosat-2B	12 July 2010	PSLV-C15	In Service
18	Resourcesat-2	20 April 2011	PSLV-C16	In Service
19	Megha-Tropiques	12 October 2011	PSLV-C18	Mission Completed
20	RISAT-1	26 April 2012	PSLV-C19	Mission Completed
21	SARAL	25 February 2013	PSLV-C20	In Service
22	Cartosat-2C	22 June 2016	PSLV-C34	In Service
23	ScatSat-1	26 September 2016	PSLV-C35	In Service
24	Resourcesat-2A	7 December 2016	PSLV-C36	In Service
25	Cartosat-2D	15 February 2017	PSLV-C37	In Service
26	Cartosat-2E	23 June 2017	PSLV-C38	In Service
27	Cartosat-2F	12 January 2018	PSLV-C40	In Service
28	RISAT-2B	22 May 2019	PSLV-C46	In Service
29	Cartosat-3	27 November 2019	PSLV-C47	In Service
30	RISAT-2BR1	11 December 2019	PSLV-C48	In Service
31	EOS-1 (RISAT-2BR2)	7 November 2020	PSLV-C49	In Service
32	EOS-3 (GISAT-1)	12 August 2021	GSLV-F10	Launch failure
33	EOS-4 (RISAT-1A)	14 February 2022	PSLV-C52	In Service
34	EOS–02 (Microsat-2A)	7 August 2022	SSLV-D1	Launch failure
35	EOS-6 (Oceansat-3)	26 November 2022	PSLV-C54	In Service
36	EOS–07 (Microsat-2B)	10 February 2023	SSLV-D2	In Service
37	EOS–08 (Microsat-2C)	16 August 2024	SSLV-D3	In Service
38	EOS-09 (RISAT-1B)	18 May 2025	PSLV-C61	Launch failure
39	EOS-N1	12 January 2026	PSLV-C62	Launch failure
40	EOS–05 (GISAT-1A)	4 September 2026	GSLV Mk II-F17	In Service
Upcoming Missions
41	EOS-10	January 2026	PSLV-N1	Planned
	Oceansat-3A	Q1 2026	PSLV-C63	Planned
	RISAT-2A	2026 (TBD)	PSLV-XL	Planned
	Cartosat-3A	2026 (TBD)	PSLV-XL	Planned
	Cartosat-3B	2026 (TBD)	PSLV-XL	Planned
	Resourcesat-3	2027 (TBD)	PSLV-XL	Planned
	Resourcesat-3A	2027 (TBD)	PSLV-XL	Planned
	Resourcesat-3B	2027 (TBD)	PSLV-XL	Planned
	Resourcesat-3S	2027 (TBD)	PSLV-XL	Planned
	Resourcesat-3SA	2027 (TBD)	PSLV-XL	Planned
	GISAT-2	2027 (TBD)		Planned
	Oceansat-4	2029 (TBD)	PSLV	Planned
	Resourcesat-4	2030 (TBD)	PSLV	Planned
	Cartosat-4	2031 (TBD)	PSLV	Planned

== IRS Data Availability ==
Data from IRS is available to its users through NRSC Data Centre and also through Bhuvan Geoportal of ISRO. NRSC data center provides data through its purchase process, while Bhuvan Geoportal provides data in free and open domain.

== Capacity Building for IRS and Other Remote Sensing Data ==
The capacity building programme of ISRO for IRS and other remote sensing applications is through Indian Institute of Remote Sensing (IIRS) Dehradun and UN affiliated Center of Space Science and Technology Education in Asia and the Pacific (CSSTEAP) Center located at Dehradun of Uttrakhand State in India.

== See also ==
- List of Indian satellites
- Indian Regional Navigation Satellite System (IRNSS)
- Indian National Satellite System (INSAT)
- GSAT
