= Krishnaswamy Kasturirangan =

Indian space scientist (1940–2025)

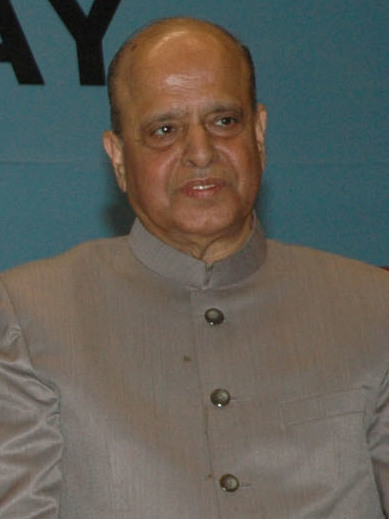

5th Chairman of ISRO
- In office 1994 – 27 August 2003
- Preceded by: Udupi Ramachandra Rao
- Succeeded by: G. Madhavan Nair

Member of Parliament, Rajya Sabha
- In office 27 August 2003 – 26 August 2009
- Nominated by: A. P. J. Abdul Kalam
- Constituency: Nominated

Personal details
- Born: 24 October 1940 Ernakulam, Kingdom of Cochin, India (present day Kochi, India)
- Died: 25 April 2025 (aged 84) Bengaluru, Karnataka, India
- Education: University of Mumbai (Bachelor of Science) (Master of Science); Physical Research Laboratory (Doctor of Philosophy)
- Awards: Padma Vibhushan
- Scientific career
- Fields: Space research
- Workplaces: National Institute of Advanced Studies; Indian Space Research Organisation

Krishnaswamy Kasturirangan (24 October 1940 – 25 April 2025) was an Indian space scientist who headed ISRO from 1994 to 2003. Until his death, he was Chancellor of Central University of Rajasthan and NIIT University. He was also chancellor of Jawaharlal Nehru University and the chairman of Karnataka Knowledge Commission. He was a member of the Rajya Sabha (2003–09) and a former member of the Planning Commission of India which was renamed as NITI Aayog in 2015. He was also the director of the National Institute of Advanced Studies, Bangalore, from April 2004 to 2009. He was a recipient of the three major civilian awards from the Government of India: the Padma Shri, the Padma Bhushan and the Padma Vibhushan.

== Early life and education ==
=== Early life ===
Kasturirangan was born on 24 October 1940, at Ernakulam in the erstwhile Kingdom of Cochin, to C. M. Krishnaswamy Iyer and Visalakshi. Kasturirangan's maternal grandfather Sri Ananthanarayana Iyer completed his school and college education and became a sanitary inspector in Ernakulam. He was well-respected in the community for his discipline and integrity. He and his wife Narayani had four daughters and a son, the eldest of whom was Visalakshi.

Kasturirangan's paternal grandfather, Chalakudy Manikam Iyer, being mindful of the importance of education, ensured that all his sons received a sound education up to graduation. Kasturirangan's father was a graduate in chemistry from Maharaja's College, Ernakulam. He worked in a variety of administrative capacities at Tata Airlines and retired as a senior accountant officer at the Indian Airlines Corporation. Kasturirangan and his brother Ravi spent their early childhood in Ernakulam in the care of their maternal grandparents after the death of their mother. At the age of ten, after the sudden death of his grandfather, he joined his father in Bombay (now Mumbai) along with his brother.

Shortly after completing his PhD in 1969, Kasturirangan married Lakshmi. They have two sons, Rajesh and Sanjay. His wife died in 1991.

=== Education ===
Kasturirangan did his schooling at Sree Rama Varma High School. Kasturirangan graduated in science with honours from Ramnarain Ruia College, Mumbai, and obtained his Master of Science degree in physics from the University of Mumbai. He received his Doctorate Degree in experimental high-energy astronomy in 1971, working at the Physical Research Laboratory, Ahmedabad. He published more than 240 papers in the areas of astronomy, space science and applications.

== Key contributions ==
Kasturirangan served as Chairman of the Indian Space Research Organisation (ISRO) for 9 years, Chairman of Space Commission and Secretary to the Government of India in the Department of Space, before laying down his office on 27 August 2003. In ISRO he served as the director of ISRO Satellite Centre, overseeing the development of new generation spacecraft, the Indian National Satellite System (INSAT-2), the Indian remote sensing satellites (IRS-1A and -1B) as well as scientific satellites. He was also the project director for India's first two experimental earth observation satellites, Bhaskara-I and II.

Under his leadership, the programme witnessed several major milestones including the successful launching and operationalisation of the India's prestigious launch vehicles, the Polar Satellite Launch Vehicle and the Geosynchronous Satellite Launch Vehicle (GSLV). Studies on the advanced version of the GSLV, GSLVMk-III, were also completed, including defining its full configuration. Further, he also oversaw the development and launching of THE remote sensing satellites, IRS-1C and IRS-1D, realisation of new generation INSAT communication satellites, besides ocean observation satellites IRS-P3 and -P4. He also led the initiative for India to enter the planetary exploration era by extensive studies leading to the definition of Chandrayaan-1. These efforts have put India as a pre-eminent space-faring nation among the handful of six countries that have major space programmes. As an astrophysicist, Kasturirangan's interests included research in high-energy X-rays and gamma-ray astronomy, as well as optical astronomy. Defining India's most ambitious space based high-energy astronomy observatory and initiating related activities was also an important milestone under his leadership. He made extensive and significant contributions to studies of cosmic X-ray and gamma-ray sources and effect of cosmic X-rays in the lower atmosphere.

Kasturirangan led a high-level Working Group on the Western Ghats in 2012 to revisit the recommendations of the Gadgil Committee on zoning. Kasturirangan was head of a committee tasked with creating the National Education Policy 2020 for India. Later in September 2021, he was appointed as the head of a 12-member steering committee which would be responsible for developing a new National Curriculum Framework. This committee, having been given a tenure of three years, will be the guiding document for the development of textbooks, syllabi and teaching practices of schools across the country.

Kasturirangan also served as a member of the board of trustees of the Raman Research Institute Trust, Bengaluru.

== Death ==
Kasturirangan died on 25 April 2025, at the age of 84.

== Honours and awards ==
Year of award of honour	Name of award of honour	Awarding organization
2009	Vikram Sarabhai Memorial Gold Medal	Indian Science Congress
2007	Theodore von Karman Award	International Academy of Astronautics
2003	Aryabhata Award	Astronautical Society of India
2000	Padma Vibhushan	Government of India
1999	H.K. Firodia Award for Excellence in Science & Technology	H K Firodia Memorial Foundation
1997	M.P. Birla Memorial Award in Astronomy	M. P. Birla Institute of Fundamental Research
1992	Padma Bhushan	Government of India
1982	Padma Shri	Government of India
1981	Intercosmos Council Award	Soviet Academy of Sciences

Kasturirangan was the recipient of honorary doctorates from 27 universities.

== Controversies ==
Kasturirangan was the superior officer of ISRO when Nambi Narayanan was accused of selling secrets to Pakistan. Kasturirangan's lack of help to the latter was noted in the movie Rocketry: The Nambi Effect.

Government offices
Preceded by U. R. Rao	ISRO Chairman; 1994–2003	Succeeded by G. Madhavan Nair
