= S. K. Shivakumar =

Indian scientist (1953–2019)

Dr. S. K. Shivakumar
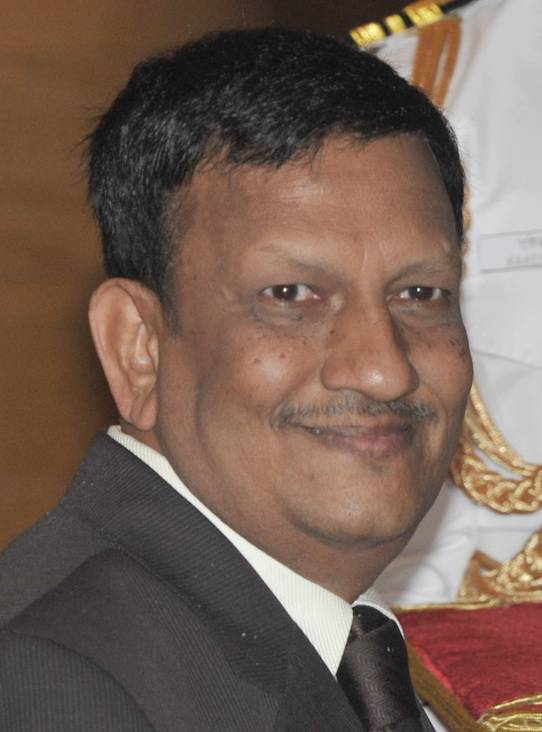
- Dr. S. K. Shivakumar in 2015
- Born: 1953; Mysore, Mysore State, India
- Died: 13 April 2019 (aged 66); Bangalore, Karnataka, India
- Education: BSc, BE, MTech, PhD
- Alma mater: Mysore University; Indian Institute of Science, Bangalore
- Known for: Indian Deep Space Network, Telemetery Tracking, Mars Orbiter Mission, Chandrayaan
- Awards: Padma Shri (2015); Nadoja Award (2013); Karnataka Rajyotsava award (2008)
- Scientific career
- Fields: Space Communications, Indian Deep Space Network, Telemetry
- Workplaces: Former director, ISAC; Former director, ISTRAC

Dr. S. K. Shivakumar (1953 – 13 April 2019) was an Indian Distinguished Scientist from Karnataka state who worked at the Indian Space Research Organisation (ISRO) centres. He was awarded the Padma Shri, the fourth highest civilian award of India, in 2015.

== Early life and education ==
Shivakumar was born in 1953 in Mysore in Mysore State (now Karnataka), India. He earned a BSc from Mysore University followed by a BE in Electrical Communications Engineering and an MTech in Physical Engineering from the Indian Institute of Science, Bangalore. He received PhD in Electronics with his dissertation on “Autonomy Features in a Spacecraft” from Kuvempu University in 2014.

== Career ==
He joined the Indian Space Research Organisation (ISRO) and started his career at its ISRO Telemetry, Tracking and Command Network (ISTRAC), Sriharikota in 1976. He later worked in its Indian Space Research Organisation Satellite Centre (ISAC) from 1978 to 1998. He was the project director for the development of the 32-metre (105 ft) dish antenna of the Indian Deep Space Network which is used for telemetry for the missions such as the Chandrayaan-1, India's first lunar exploration mission and Mangalyaan, India's first interplanetary mission.

He was involved in several satellite missions such as Bhaskara, Indian National Satellite System (INSAT), Ariane Passenger Payload Experiment (APPLE) and Indian Remote Sensing Programme (IRS). Shivakumar was the mission director of the IRS-1B and IRS-1C satellite missions. He also served as the director of the ISTRAC between September 1998 and November 2010. Shivakumar was later the associate director of the ISAC from November 2010 to June 2012 and Director of ISAC from July 2012 to March 2015 spearheaded the Manglayaan project.

His biggest contribution to ISRO in his 40 years there has been that of setting up the Indian Deep Space Network .

As of 2019, he was serving as chairman of Karnataka Science and Technology Council.

== Awards ==
- Padma Shri, the fourth highest civilian award of India, in 2015
- Karnataka Rajyotsava Award (2008)
- Nadoja Award (2013)
- Honorary Doctorate (DSc) by the Mysore University
- National Aeronautical Award (2008) from the Aeronautical Society of India
- Elected academician of the International Academy of Astronautics
- ‘Hamsa Ratna’ Award from Hamsajyothi, for achievement in the field of Science and Technology.
- Indian National Remote Sensing Award of Indian Society of Remote Sensing 1993
- Astronomical Society Of India (ASI) Award – 2005 for space systems management
- ISRO Merit Award for outstanding contributions to Ground Systems establishment.
- Received “Laurels for Team Achievement” from the International Academy of Astronautics (IAA) for the work carried out during PSLV-C7/Cartosat-2/SRE mission. An elected academician of the IAA

== Death ==
He died on 13 April 2019 at the age of 66 in Bangalore and was cremated at the Banashankari Crematorium. The cause of death was reported to be post-hepatic jaundice.
