= Resourcesat-1 =

Indian earth observation satellite

- Names: IRS-P6; ResourceSat-1
- Mission type: Earth observation
- Operator: ISRO
- COSPAR ID: 2003-046A
- SATCAT no.: 28051
- Website: https://www.isro.gov.in/
- Mission duration: 5 years (planned); 22 years, 1 month and 22 days (in progress)

Spacecraft properties
- Spacecraft: IRS-P6
- Bus: IRS-1A
- Manufacturer: Indian Space Research Organisation
- Launch mass: 1,360 kg (3,000 lb)
- Power: 1250 watts

Start of mission
- Launch date: 17 October 2003, 04:54:00 UTC
- Rocket: Polar Satellite Launch Vehicle, PSLV-C5
- Launch site: Satish Dhawan Space Centre, First Launch Pad (FLP)
- Contractor: Indian Space Research Organisation
- Entered service: January 2004

Orbital parameters
- Reference system: Geocentric orbit
- Regime: Sun-synchronous orbit
- Perigee altitude: 813 km
- Apogee altitude: 836 km
- Inclination: 98.8°
- Period: 101.4 minutes
Instruments
- LISS-4: 5.8 metre multispectral: Linear Imaging Self-Scanning Sensor-4
- LISS-3: 23.5 metre multispectral: Linear Imaging Self-Scanning Sensor-3
- AWiFS: 56 metre multispectral: Advanced Wide Field Sensor

Resourcesat-1 (also known as IRS-P6) is an advanced remote sensing satellite built by Indian Space Research Organization (ISRO). The tenth satellite of ISRO in IRS series, Resourcesat-1 is intended to not only continue the remote sensing data services provided by IRS-1C and IRS-1D, both of which have far outlived their designed mission lives, but also vastly enhance the data quality.

== Launch ==
The 1360 kg Resourcesat-1 was launched into an 817 km high polar Sun-synchronous orbit by the eighth flight of India's Polar Satellite Launch Vehicle (PSLV-C5).

== Instruments ==
Resourcesat-1 carries three cameras similar to those of IRS-1C and IRS-1D but with vastly improved spatial resolutions - a high resolution Linear Imaging Self-Scanning Sensor-4 (LISS-4) operating in three spectral bands in the Visible and Near Infrared Region (VNIR) with 5.8 metre spatial resolution and steerable up to 26° across track to obtain stereoscopic imagery and achieve five-day revisit capability; a medium resolution Linear Imaging Self-Scanning Sensor-3 (LISS-3) operating in three spectral bands in VNIR and one in Short Wave Infrared (SWIR) band with 23.5 metre spatial resolution; and an Advanced Wide Field Sensor (AWiFS) operating in three spectral bands in VNIR and one band in SWIR with 56 metre spatial resolution.

Short Wave Infrared bands for LISS-3
Spectral Band	Wavelength	Resolution
Band 1	0.52 - 0.59 μm	23.5 m
Band 2	0.62 - 0.68 μm	23.5 m
Band 3	0.77 - 0.86 μm	23.5 m
Band 4	1.55 - 1.70 μm	23.5 m

AWiFS Spectral Bands
Spectral Band	Wavelength	Resolution
Band 1	0.52 - 0.59 μm	56 m
Band 2	0.62 - 0.68 μm	56 m
Band 3	0.77 - 0.86 μm	56 m
Band 4	1.55 - 1.70 μm	56 m

Resourcesat-1 also carries a solid state recorder with a capacity of 120 Gigabits to store the images taken by its cameras which can be read out later to the ground stations.

== See also ==
- List of Indian satellites
- Resourcesat-2
