= PSLV-C5 =

- Model of the PSLV rocket
- Names: Cartosat-1 mission
- Mission type: Deployment of Resourcesat-1 satellite.
- Operator: ISRO
- Website: ISRO website
- Mission duration: 1,084 seconds

Spacecraft properties
- Spacecraft: Polar Satellite Launch Vehicle
- Spacecraft type: Expendable launch vehicle
- Manufacturer: ISRO
- Launch mass: 295,930 kilograms (652,410 lb)
- Payload mass: 1,360 kilograms (3,000 lb)
- Dimensions: 44.4 metres (146 ft) (overall height)

Start of mission
- Launch date: 04:52, October 17, 2003 (UTC)
- Rocket: Polar Satellite Launch Vehicle
- Launch site: Satish Dhawan Space Centre
- Contractor: ISRO

End of mission
- Deactivated: October 17, 2003

Orbital parameters
- Reference system: Sun-synchronous orbit

Payload
- Resourcesat-1 (also known as IRS-P6)
- Mass: 1,360 kilograms (3,000 lb)

PSLV-C5 was the fifth operational launch and overall eighth mission of the Polar Satellite Launch Vehicle program. This launch was also the fifty-second launch by the Indian Space Research Organisation (IRSO) since its first mission on 1 January 1962. The vehicle carried and injected India's remote sensing satellite Resourcesat-1 (also known as IRS-P6) into a Sun-synchronous orbit; this was the heaviest and most sophisticated satellite built by IRSO through 2003. PSLV-C5 was launched at 04:52 hours Coordinated Universal Time (10:22 hours Indian Standard Time) on 17 October 2003 from Satish Dhawan Space Centre.

== Mission highlights ==
PSLV-C5 was the fifth operational and overall eighth mission of the PSLV program. The vehicle carried and injected the heaviest and most sophisticated remote sensing satellite built by the ISRO through 2003, Resourcesat-1 (also known as IRS-P6).

== Mission parameters ==
- Mass:
  - Total liftoff weight: 295,930 kilograms (652,410 lb)
  - Payload weight: 1,360 kilograms (3,000 lb)
- Overall height: 44.4 metres (145.7 ft)
- Propellant:
  - First stage: Solid HTPB based (138.0 + 6 x 9 tonnes)
  - Second stage: Liquid UH 25 + N_{2}O_{4} (41.5 tonnes)
  - Third stage: Solid HTPB based (7.6 tonnes)
  - Fourth stage: Liquid MMH + MON (2.5 tonnes)
- Engine:
  - First stage: Core (PS 1) + 6 strap-on Propellant strap on motors (PSOM)
  - Second stage: Vikas
  - Third stage: PS 3
  - Fourth stage: PS 4
- Thrust:
  - First stage: 4,762 + 645 x 6 kN
  - Second stage: 800 kN
  - Third stage: 246 kN
  - Fourth stage: 7.3 x 2 kN
- Altitude: 827 kilometres (514 mi)
- Maximum velocity:7,440 metres per second (24,409 ft/s) (recorded at time of IRS-P6 separation)
- Duration: 1,084 seconds

== Payload ==
PSLV-C5 carried and deployed the ISRO's Resourcesat-1 (a.k.a. IRS-P6) into a sun-synchronous orbit. Resourcesat-1, which carried three cameras ("High Resolution Linear Imaging Self-Scanner", "Medium Resolution Linear Imaging Self-Scanner" and "Advanced Wide Field Sensor") was the tenth ISRO satellite in the IRS series and was intended not only to continue the remote sensing data services provided by IRS-1C and IRS-1D, but also to enhance the data quality. Although IRS-P6 had a design life of five years, the satellite was still operational as of October 2015.

Country	Name	Nos	Mass	Type	Objective
India	IRS-P6	1	1,360 kg	Satellite	Earth observation

== Launch and planned flight profile ==
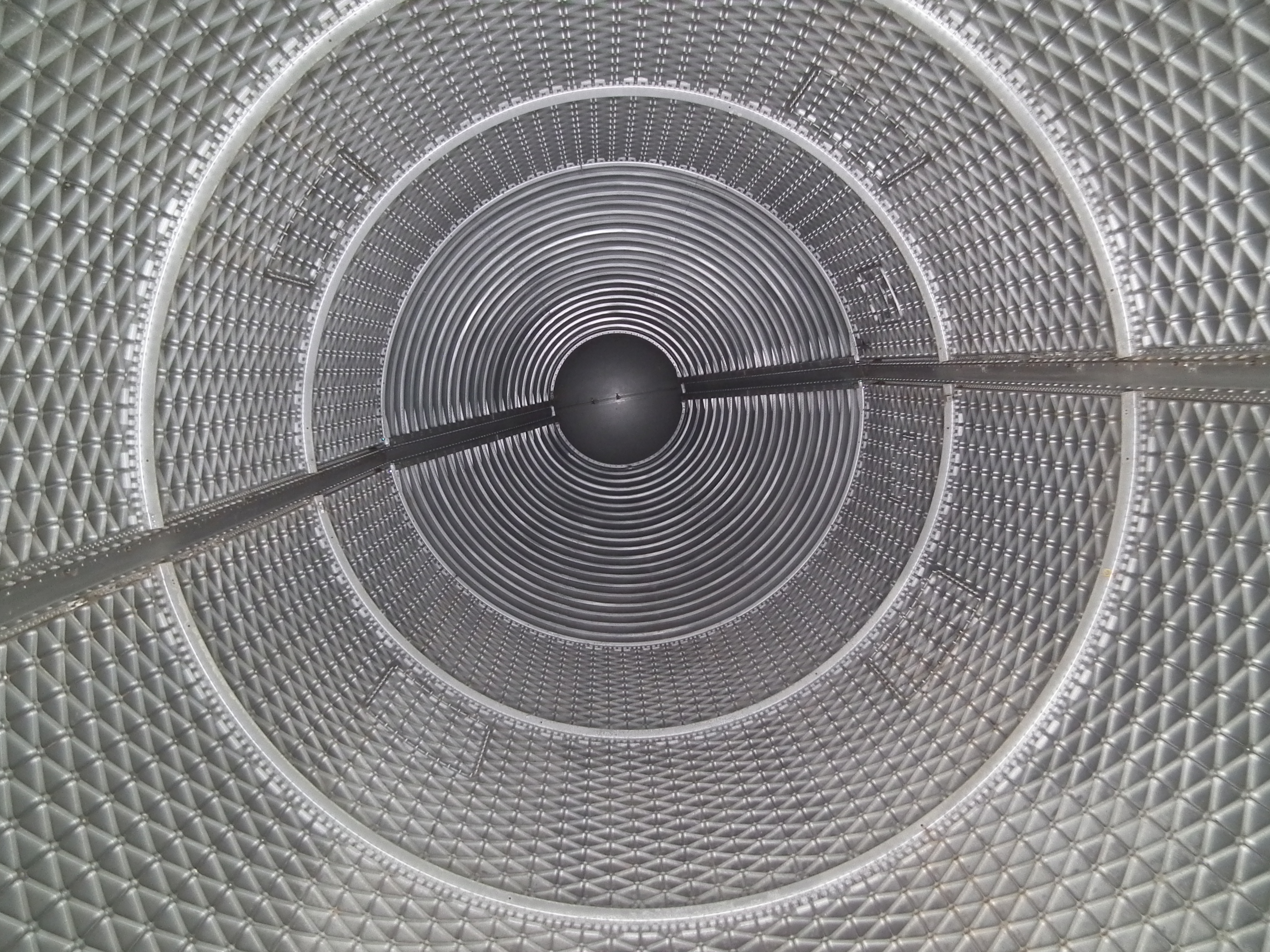
Heat shield of PSLV displayed at HAL heritage center.

PSLV-C5 was launched at 04:52 hours Coordinated Universal Time (10:22 hours Indian Standard Time) on 17 October 2003 from Satish Dhawan Space Centre. The mission was planned with pre-flight prediction of covering overall altitude of 827 kilometres (514 mi). The flight profile was as follows:

Stage	Time (seconds)	Altitude (kilometre)	Velocity (metres/sec)	Event	Remarks
First stage	T+0	0.02	452	Ignition of PS 1	Lift off
First stage	T+1.2	0.02	452	Ignition of 4 ground-lit PSOM	
First stage	T+25	2.348	543	Ignition of 2 air-lit PSOM	
First stage	T+68	23.230	1,156	Separation of 4 ground-lit PSOM	
First stage	T+90	41.844	1,609	Separation of 2 air-lit PSOM	
First stage	T+113.01	67.353	1,991	Separation of PS 1	
Second stage	T+113.21	67.578	1,990	Ignition of PS 2	
Second stage	T+157.01	115.706	2,316	Separation of heat shield	
Second stage	T+265.73	244.864	4,153	Separation of PS 2	
Third stage	T+266.93	246.531	4,149	Ignition of HPS 3	
Third stage	T+522.85	591.593	5,854	Separation of HPS 3	
Fourth stage	T+556.5	626.557	6,768	Ignition of PS 4	
Fourth stage	T+1,017.0	826.388	7,426	Cut-off of PS 4	
Fourth stage	T+1,084.0	827.032	7,440	Resourcesat-1 separation	Mission complete
