= Oceansat =

Indian class of oceanography satellites

- Manufacturer: ISRO
- Country of origin: India
- Operator: ISRO
- Applications: Oceanographic studies

Specifications
- Bus: IRS
- Launch mass: ~1,000 kg (2,200 lb)
- Equipment: Ocean Colour Monitor; Pencil beam scatterometer Microwave radiometer Radio Occultation Sounder for Atmosphere
- Regime: SSO

Production
- Status: Operational
- Launched: 4 (including 1 continuity support mission)
- Operational: 3 (including 1 continuity support mission)
- Retired: 1
- Maiden launch: Oceansat-1 (1999)
- Last launch: Oceansat-3 (2022)

Oceansat is a series of Earth observation satellites built, launched, and operated by Indian Space Research Organisation, and dedicated to oceanography and atmospheric studies. Oceansat satellites facilitate a range of applications including documenting chlorophyll concentration, phytoplankton blooms, atmospheric aerosols and particulate matter as well as marine weather forecast to predict cyclones.

== Satellites ==
=== Oceansat-1 ===
OceanSat-1 was the first Indian satellite built specifically for oceanographic applications. The satellite carried an Ocean Colour Monitor (OCM) and a multi-frequency scanning microwave radiometer. Oceansat-1 was launched on board a PSLV rocket on 26 May 1999.

It was capable of detecting eight spectrums ranging from 400 nm to 885 nm, all in the visible or near infrared spectrums. The second, the Multi-frequency Scanning Microwave Radiometer, collects data by measuring microwave radiation passing through the atmosphere over the ocean. This offers information including sea surface temperature, wind speed, cloud water content, and water vapour content.

Although initially launched with a lifespan of 5 years, Oceansat-1 completed its mission on August 8, 2010, after serving for 11 years and 2 months.

=== Oceansat-2 ===
Oceansat-2 is designed to provide service continuity for operational users of the Ocean Colour Monitor (OCM) instrument on Oceansat-1 and enhance the potential of applications in other areas.

A swath width of 1420 km is provided. An along-track instrument tilt capability of ±20º is provided to avoid sun glint.

Satellite was launched aboard a PSLV-CA on 23 September 2009.

==== SCATSAT-1 ====
SCATSAT-1 was launched in 2016 after SCAT (Scanning scatterometer) on Oceansat-2 became dysfunctional after its life span of four-and-a-half years. SCATSAT carries a Ku-band scatterometer similar to the one on Oceansat-2.

=== Oceansat-3 ===
Oceansat-3 was launched on 26 November 2022, Oceansat-3 will provide continuity to operators of OCM and enhanced ability in other applications by way of simultaneous Sea Surface Temperature (SST) measurements. As of March 2021, ISRO and CNES completed interface control document to accommodate Argos in Oceansat-3.

== List of Oceansat Satellites ==
Designation	COSPAR ID	NORAD ID	Power	Launch date, Time (UTC)	Launch mass	Launch vehicle	Launch site	Status	Remarks
Oceansat-1/IRS-P4	1999-029C	25758	750 W	26 May 1999, 06:22:00	1,036 kg (2,284 lb)	PSLV-G C2	FLP, SDSC	Retired	Completed a life a span more than double of planned.
Oceansat-2	2009-051A	35931		23 September 2009, 06:21	960 kg (2,120 lb)	PSLV-CA C14	SLP, SDSC	Operational	Tilt ability up to 20 degrees
SCATSAT-1	2016-059H	41790		26 September 2016, 03:42	371 kg (818 lb)	PSLV-G C35	FLP, SDSC	Retired	Continuity mission after SCAT on Oceansat-2 got dysfunctional
Oceansat-3/EOS-06	2022-158A	54361		26 November 2022, 06:26	1,117 kg (2,463 lb)	PSLV-XL C54	FLP, SDSC	Operational	
EOS-10 (Oceansat-3A)				Q1 2026		PSLV-XL N1	SDSC	Planned	

== See also ==
- Indian Remote Sensing Programme
- Cartosat
- RISAT
- Indian Space Research Organisation
