= IRS-P2 =

Indian Earth observation satellite

- Names: Indian Remote Sensing satellite-P2
- Mission type: Earth observation
- Operator: ISRO
- COSPAR ID: 1994-068A
- SATCAT no.: 23323
- Website: https://www.isro.gov.in/
- Mission duration: 3 years (planned); 3 years (achieved)

Spacecraft properties
- Spacecraft: IRS-P2
- Bus: IRS-1A
- Manufacturer: Indian Space Research Organisation
- Launch mass: 804 kg (1,773 lb)
- Dry mass: 724 kg (1,596 lb)
- Power: 510 watts

Start of mission
- Launch date: 15 October 1994. 05:05 UTC
- Rocket: Polar Satellite Launch Vehicle PSLV-D2
- Launch site: Satish Dhawan Space Centre, First Launch Pad (FLP)
- Contractor: Indian Space Research Organisation
- Entered service: 7 November 1994

End of mission
- Deactivated: 15 September 1997

Orbital parameters
- Reference system: Geocentric orbit
- Regime: Sun-synchronous orbit
- Perigee altitude: 804 km (500 mi)
- Apogee altitude: 881 km (547 mi)
- Inclination: 98.68°
- Period: 98.7 minutes

Instruments
- Linear Imaging Self-Scanning Sensor-2M (LISS-2M)

IRS-P2 was an Earth observation satellite launched under the National Natural Resources Management System (NNRMS) programme undertaken by Indian Space Research Organisation (ISRO). The objectives of the mission were to provide spaceborne capability to India in observing and managing natural resources and utilizing them in a productive manner. The satellite carried imaging multi-spectral radiometers on board for radio sensing of the resources.

== History ==
The satellite was designed, developed and tested in just one and a half years. IRS-P2 is one of the satellites in the Indian Remote Sensing Programme of Earth Observation satellites, assembled, launched and maintained by the Indian Space Research Organisation. The satellite was controlled by ISRO Telemetry Tracking and Command Network (ISTRAC) in Bangalore, Lucknow and Mauritius. The National Remote Sensing Agency (NRSC), Hyderabad received the first signal from IRS-P2, 98 minutes after the launch. The IRS-P2 was declared operational from 7 November 1994 after certain orbital manoeuvres and started its 3-year-long observation mission. The letter "P" indicates that the satellite was to be launched aboard a Polar Satellite Launch Vehicle (PSLV).

== Instrument ==
IRS-P2 carried an instrument, the Linear Imaging Self-Scanning Sensor-2M (LISS-2M), two solid state push broom cameras operating using Charge-coupled device (CCD) and were capable of providing imagery in four spectral bands in the visible and near-infrared range with 32 m (105 ft) resolution.

== Mission ==
IRS-P2 completed its mission successfully on 15 September 1997 after a duration of 3 years.

The images was marketed through a private company in the United States. The data transmitted from the satellite was gathered from National Remote Sensing Centre, Hyderabad and EOSAT, a partnership of Hughes Aircraft and RCA.

== See also ==
- Indian Remote Sensing
