= Udupi Ramachandra Rao =

Indian space scientist (1932–2017)

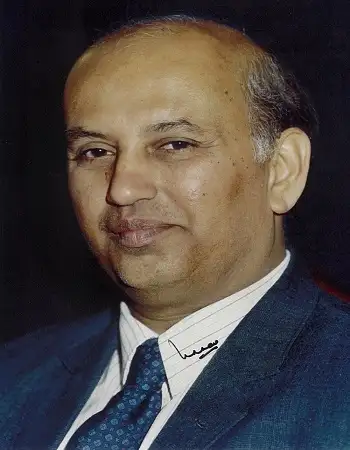

4th Chairman of ISRO
- In office 1984 – 1994
- Preceded by: Satish Dhawan
- Succeeded by: Krishnaswamy Kasturirangan

Personal details
- Born: 10 March 1932 Adamaru, South Canara district, Madras Presidency, British India (present-day Adamaru, Udupi district, Karnataka, India)
- Died: 24 July 2017 (aged 85) Bengaluru, Karnataka, India
- Spouse: Yashoda Rao
- Education: Madras University (BSc); Banaras Hindu University (MSc); Gujarat University (PhD)
- Known for: Indian Space Program
- Awards: Shanti Swarup Bhatnagar Memorial Award (1975); Karnataka Rajyotsava Award (1975); Medal of Honour by Academy of Sciences, USSR (1975); Padma Bhushan (1976); Gujar Mal Modi Award for Science & Technology (1999); Theodore Von Karman Award (2005); Padma Vibhushan (2017)
- Scientific career
- Fields: Space science and Satellite Technology
- Workplaces: Indian Space Research Organisation; Physical Research Laboratory; Jawaharlal Nehru Planetarium, Bengaluru
- Doctoral advisor: Vikram Sarabhai

Udupi Ramachandra Rao (10 March 1932 – 24 July 2017) was an Indian space scientist and former chairman of ISRO. He was also the Chairman of the Governing Council of the Physical Research Laboratory at Ahmedabad and Nehru Planetarium at Bengaluru and chancellor of the Indian Institute for Space Science and Technology (IIST) at Thiruvananthapuram. He is known as "The Satellite Man of India". He pioneered India's first satellite launch Aryabhata in 1975.

Rao was awarded the Padma Bhushan by the Government of India in 1976, and the Padma Vibhushan in 2017. He was inducted into the Satellite Hall of Fame, Washington, on 19 March 2013 at a ceremony organised by the Society of Satellite Professionals International. With this he became the first Indian to be inducted. He was also to be inducted in International Astronautics Federation (IAF) on 15 May 2016. He was again the first Indian to achieve such a feat.

== Early life ==
U. R. Rao was born into a Madhwa Brahmin Hindu family at Adamaru in the state of Karnataka. His parents were Lakshminarayana Acharya and Krishnaveni Amma. He had his primary education at Adamaru. He completed his secondary education from Christian High School, Udupi. He completed his B.Sc. from Government Arts and Science College (now in Andhra Pradesh), M.Sc. from Banaras Hindu University and Ph.D. at Physical Research Laboratory Ahemdabad under the guidance of Vikram Sarabhai.

== Education ==
- Ph.D. – Gujarat University, 1960
- M.Sc. – Banaras Hindu University, 1954
- B.Sc. – Madras University, 1952

After working as a post doctoral associate at Massachusetts Institute of Technology (MIT) and Assistant Professor at University of Texas at Dallas where he carried out investigations as a prime experimenter on a number of Pioneer and Explorer spacecraft, Rao returned to India in 1966 as a professor at the Physical Research Laboratory in Ahmedabad.

== Career ==
Rao started his career as a cosmic ray scientist and worked under Vikram Sarabhai, which he continued at MIT. In association with the Jet Propulsion Laboratory group, he was the first to establish the continuous nature of the solar wind and its effect on geomagnetism using Mariner 2 observations. Rao's experiments on a number of Pioneer and Explorer spacecraft led to a complete understanding of the solar cosmic-ray phenomena and the electromagnetic state of the interplanetary space. Convinced of the imperative need to use space technology for rapid development, Rao undertook the responsibility for the establishment of satellite technology in India in 1972. Under his guidance, beginning with the first Indian satellite "Aryabhata" in 1975, over 18 satellites including Bhaskara, APPLE, Rohini, INSAT-1 and INSAT-2 series of multipurpose satellites and the IRS-1A and IRS-1B remote sensing satellites were designed, fabricated and launched for providing communication, remote sensing, and meteorological services.

== As Chairman of ISRO ==
After taking charge as Chairman, Space Commission and Secretary, Department of Space in 1985, Rao accelerated the development of rocket technology resulting in the successful launch of the Augmented Satellite Launch Vehicle (ASLV) rocket in 1992. He was also responsible for the development of the operational the Polar Satellite Launch Vehicle (PSLV), which successfully launched an 850 kg. satellite into a polar orbit in 1995. Rao initiated the development of the geostationary launch vehicle, the Geosynchronous Satellite Launch Vehicle (GSLV), and the development of cryogenic technology in 1991. He was responsible for successful launch of INSAT satellites during his stint at ISRO. The launch of INSAT satellites gave a thrust to communications in India, during the 1980s and 1990s. The successful launch of INSAT provided telecommunication links to remote corners of India. During these decades fixed telephone (called as landline) expanded throughout country due to availability of satellite links at different places in the ground. People could talk easily from anywhere by use of STD (Subscriber Trunk Dialing) instead of waiting for hours to get the connection. This development played a key role in future for India to develop as an Information Technology hub. He was the first Chairman of Antrix Corporation. He received the Padma Bhushan in 1976. He was the first Indian space scientist to be allowed into the prestigious Satellite Hall of Fame in Washington DC, USA in recent past on 19 March 2013.

== Additional responsibilities ==
Rao was an elected Fellow of many academies such as Indian Academy of Sciences, Indian National Science Academy, National Academy of Sciences, Institute of Electronics and Telecommunications Engineers, International Academy of Astronautics and Third World Academy of Sciences. Rao was conferred Fellowship of the World Academy of Arts & Sciences. He was the General President of the Indian Science Congress Association for 1995-96. Rao was the Vice President of International Astronautical Federation (IAF) during 1984 to 1992 and continued to be the Chairman of the Committee for Liaison with Developing Countries (CLIODN) since 1986. Rao was elected as the Chairman of United Nations - Committee On Peaceful Uses of Outer Space (UN-COPUOS) in June 1997 and also Chairman of UNISPACE-III Conference. He was elected as the Chairman of the 30th International Antarctic Treaty Consultative Committee Meeting at Delhi in April 2007.

He was the Co-Chairman of the National Centre for Antarctic and Ocean Research, Goa. He was the first chairman of Prasar Bharati. Rao was the Fourth President of the Governing Body of the Centre for Space Physics in 2007. While the President, he changed its name to Indian Centre for Space Physics in recognition of its national importance.

Other positions held by Rao in India include:

- Chairman, Karnataka Science and Technology Academy
- Chairman, Bangalore Association of Science Education-JNP
- Chancellor, Babasaheb Bhimrao Ambedkar University, Lucknow
- Member, Central Board of Directors, Reserve Bank of India
- Additional Director, Bharatiya Reserve Bank Note Mudran Private Ltd., Bangalore
- Chairman, Governing Council of Indian Institute of Tropical Meteorology, Pune

== Awards ==
He was the recipient of various national and international awards, including:

National Awards

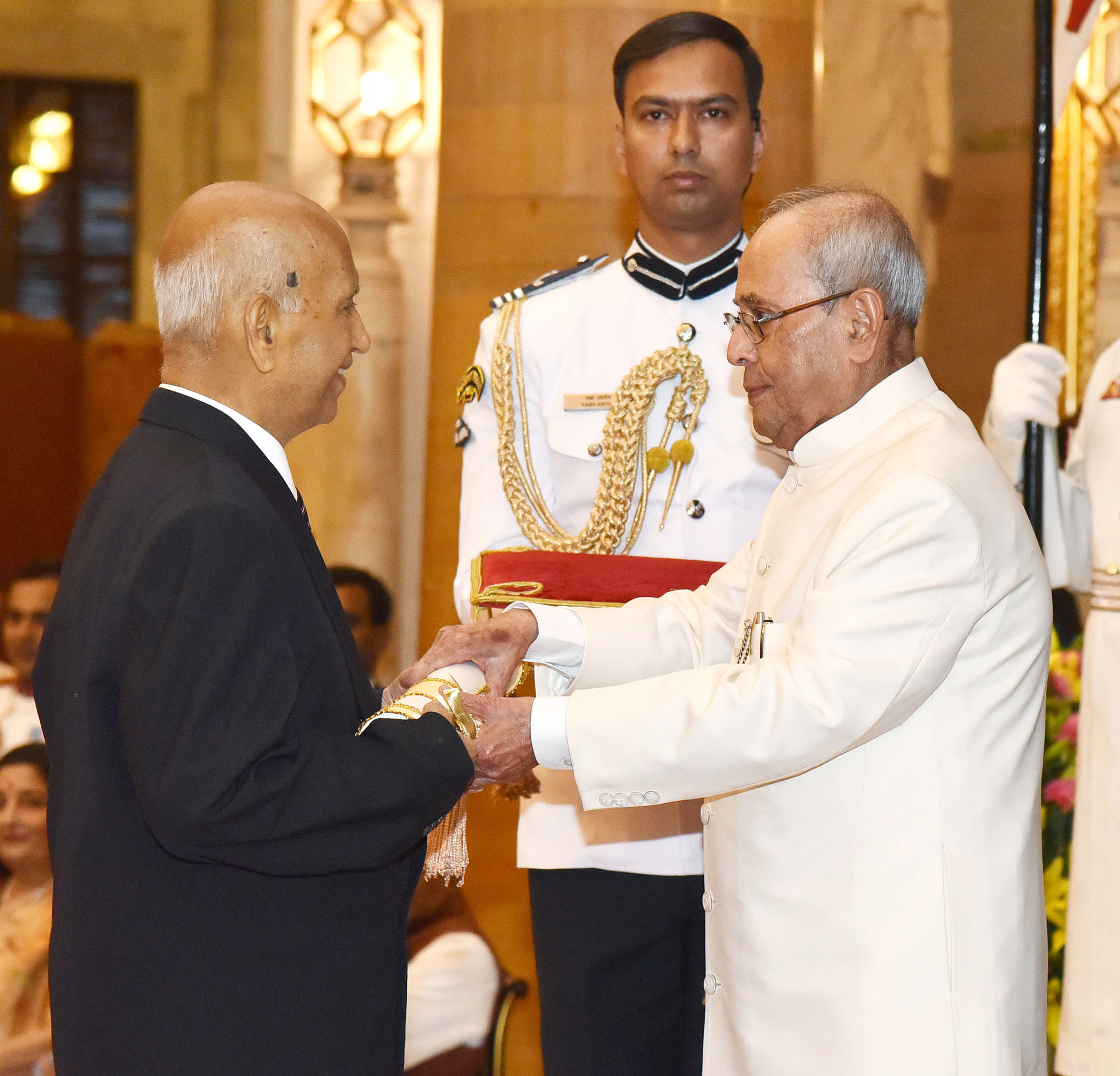
The President, Shri Pranab Mukherjee presenting the Padma Vibhushan Award to Prof. Udupi Ramachandra Rao, at a Civil Investiture Ceremony, at Rashtrapati Bhavan, in New Delhi on 30 March 2017

- 1975 Karnataka Rajyotsava Award
- 1975 Hari Om Vikram Sarabhai Award
- 1975 Shanti Swarup Bhatnagar Award in the Space science & technology field
- 1976 Padma Bhushan
- 1980 National Design Award
- 1980 Vasvik Research Award in the Electronic Sciences & Technology field
- 1983 Karnataka Rajyotsava Award
- 1987 PC Mahalnobis Medal
- 1993 Om Prakash Bhasin Award in the Energy & Aerospace field
- 1993 Meghnad Saha Medal
- 1994 P.C. Chandra Puraskar Award
- 1994 Electronics Man of the Year Award by ELCINA
- 1995 Zaheer Hussain Memorial Award
- 1995 Aryabhata Award
- 1995 Jawaharhal Nehru Award
- 1996 SK Mitra Birth Centenary Gold Medal
- 1997 Yudhvir Foundation Award
- 1997 Rabindranath Tagore Award of Viswa Bharati University
- 1999 Gujar Mal Modi Award for Science & Technology
- 2001 Nadoja Award from Kannada University, Hampi
- 2001 Life Time Contribution Award in Engineering of INAE
- 2002 Sir M. Visvesvaraya Memorial Award
- 2003 Press Bureau of India Award
- 2004 Star of India Award from Vishwabharathy Foundation, Hyderabad
- 2004 Special Award 2004, Karnataka Media Academy
- 2005 Bharat Ratna Rajiv Gandhi Outstanding Leadership Award
- 2007 Life Time Achievement Award of Indian Space Research Organisation
- 2007 Distinguished Scientist Gold Medal of the Karnataka Science & Technology Academy.
- 2007 Vishwamanava Award by Vishwamanava Samsthe
- 2007 A.V. Rama Rao Technology Award
- 2008 Jawaharlal Nehru Birth Centenary Award for 2007-2008 from ISCA
- 2017 Padma Vibhushan

International Awards

- 1973 Group Achievement Award by NASA, USA
- 1975 Medal of Honour by Academy of Sciences, USSR
- 1991 Yuri Gagarin Medal of USSR
- 1992 Allan D Emil Award on International Cooperation
- 1994 Frank J Malina Award (International Astronautical Federation)
- 1996 Vikram Sarabhai Medal of COSPAR
- 1997 Outstanding Book Award of the International Academy of Astronautics for the Book Space Technology for Sustainable Development
- 2000 Eduard Dolezal Award of ISPRS
- 2004 Space News magazine named him as one of the Top 10 International personalities who have made a substantial difference in civil, commerce and military space in the world since 1989
- 2005 Theodore Von Karman Award which is the highest Award of the International Academy of Astronautics.
- 2013 Inducted into Satellite Hall of Fame by Society of Satellite Professionals International'
- 2016 Inducted into Hall of Fame by International Astronautical Federation
- 2017 Asian Scientist 100, Asian Scientist

== Honours ==
People's President and distinguished scientist Dr. A. P. J. Abdul Kalam had an effective association with Prof. U. R. Rao. While Dr. A.P. J. Abdul Kalam was President, he presented the Life Time Achievement Award constituted by ISRO and Astronautical Society of India (ASI) to Prof. Rao for his outstanding contribution to the organization.

D. Litt. (Hon. Causa) from Kannada University, Hampi

D.Sc (Hons. Causa) from the Universities of:

- 1976 Mysore
- 1976 Rahuri
- 1981 Calcutta
- 1984 Mangalore
- 1992 University of Bologna (Italy)
- 1992 Banaras
- 1992 Udaipur
- 1993 Tirupati (SV)
- 1994 Hyderabad (JN)
- 1994 Madras (Anna University)
- 1994 Roorkee University
- 1995 Punjabi University, Patiala
- 1997 Shri Shahu Ji Maharaj University, Kanpur
- 1999 Indian School of Mines, Dhanbad
- 2001 D.Litt. (Hons. Causa) from Kannada University, Hampi
- 2002 Ch. Charan Singh University, Meerut
- 2005 UP Technical University, Lucknow
- 2006 Viswesvaraiah Technical University, Belgaum
- 2007 Indian Institute of Technology - Delhi

== Legacy ==
On March 10, 2021, a Google Doodle was made in honor of his 89th birthday.

== Fellowships / Memberships ==
- Fellow of the Indian Academy of Sciences
- Fellow of the Indian National Science Academy
- Fellow of National Science Academy
- Fellow of Third World Academy of Sciences
- Fellow of the International Academy of Astronautics
- Fellow of Indian National Academy of Engineering
- Fellow of the Astronautical Society of India
- Hon. Fellow of the Aeronautical Society
- Distinguished Fellow Institution of Electronics and Telecommunication Engineers
- Hon. Fellow of Indian National Cartographic Association
- Fellow of Broadcasting and Engineering Society of India
- Hon. Fellow Aero Medical Society of India
- Distinguished Fellow of Physical Research Laboratory, Ahmedabad
- Fellow of World Academy of Arts & Sciences, USA.
- Fellow of International Aeronautical Federation (IAF) proposed.

== Professional Activities in International Arena ==
- 1986-1992 Vice President, International Astronautical Federation
- 1988 to ???? President, Committee for Liaison with Developing Nations (CLODIN) of IAF
- 1997-2000 Chairman, UN-COPUOS (United Nations - Committee on Peaceful Uses of Outer Space)
- 1999 President, UNISPACE-III Conference
- 2007 Chairman, 30th International Antarctic Treaty Consultative Committee Meeting

Other roles

- President of UNISPACE III Conference, Vienna, in 1979
- Led Indian Delegation in COPUOS and S&T Sub Committee of COPUOS from 1980 to 1994, UNISPACE-II in 1982 and President UNISPACE-III in 2000.
- Chairman of the UN Committee on Peaceful Uses of Outer Space (1996–1999)

== Books authored ==
- U. R. Rao, K. Kasturirangan, K. R. Sridhara Murthi. and Surendra Pal (Editors), "Perspectives in Communications", World Scientific (1987). ISBN 978-9971-978-76-1
- U. R. Rao, "Space and Agenda 21 - Caring for Planet Earth", Prism Books Pvt. Ltd., Bangalore (1995).
- U. R. Rao, "Space Technology for Sustainable Development", Tata McGraw-Hill Pub., New Delhi (1996)

Government offices
Preceded by Satish Dhawan	ISRO Chairman; 1984 - 1994	Succeeded by K Kasturirangan
