= IRS-1E =

Indian Earth observation satellite

- Names: Indian Remote Sensing satellite-1E; Indian Remote Sensing satellite-P1
- Mission type: Earth observation
- Operator: ISRO
- Website: https://www.isro.gov.in/
- Mission duration: 3 years (planned); Failed to orbit

Spacecraft properties
- Spacecraft: IRS-1E (P1)
- Bus: IRS-1A
- Manufacturer: Indian Space Research Organisation
- Launch mass: 846 kg (1,865 lb)
- Dry mass: 766 kg (1,689 lb)
- Dimensions: 1.56 m x 1.66 m x 1.10 m
- Power: 415 watts

Start of mission
- Launch date: 20 September 1993, 05:12 UTC
- Rocket: Polar Satellite Launch Vehicle (PSLV-D1)
- Launch site: Satish Dhawan Space Centre, First Launch Pad (FLP)
- Contractor: Indian Space Research Organisation
- Entered service: Failed to orbit

Orbital parameters
- Reference system: Geocentric orbit (planned)
- Regime: Sun-synchronous orbit
- Perigee altitude: 817 km (508 mi)
- Apogee altitude: 817 km (508 mi)
- Inclination: 98.6°
- Period: 103.0 minutes

Instruments
- Linear Imaging Self-Scanning Sensor-1 (LISS-1); Monocular Electro-Optical Stereo Scanner (MEOSS)

IRS-1E was an Earth observation mission launched under the National Natural Resources Management System (NNRMS) programme by Indian Space Research Organisation (ISRO). Sometimes written IRS-P1. The objective of the mission was to develop Earth imagery using instruments carried on board. Due to a malfunction of the launch vehicle, the satellite deviated from its path and plunged into the Indian Ocean.

== History ==
IRS-1E was a follow-up mission to the satellite IRS-1A, to develop India's capability in the field of remote sensing. The satellite was to take up missions in the area of ground-water exploration, land use, forest and flood mapping. The letter "E" indicates that the satellite was an engineering model. The letter "P" (IRS-P1) in the Indian Remote Sensing Programme of Earth observation satellite indicates that the satellite was to be launched aboard a Polar Satellite Launch Vehicle (PSLV). It was launched on 20 September 1993.

== Instruments ==
IRS-1E carried two instruments:

- Linear Imaging Self-Scanning Sensor-1 (LISS-1)
- MEOSS (Monocular Electro-Optical Stereo Scanner), built by the German Aerospace Center (DLR), is an experimental sensor with pushbroom Charge-coupled device (CCD) technology. MEOSS is a stereo camera system capable of recording three images simultaneously with a single lens by means of linear scanning (3-line stereo system).

== Launch ==
IRS-1E mission was a failure, as the last stage of the PSLV-D1 malfunctioned, so failed to launch the satellite into its desired orbit. The PSLV was first launched on 20 September 1993, at 05:12 UTC. The first and second stages performed as expected, but an attitude control problem led to the collision of the second and third stages at separation, and the satellite failed to reach orbit. After this initial setback, the PSLV successfully completed its second mission in 1994.

== See also ==
- Indian Remote Sensing
