= Resourcesat-2 =

Indian earth observation satellite

- Names: ResourceSat-2
- Mission type: Earth observation
- Operator: ISRO
- COSPAR ID: 2011-015A
- SATCAT no.: 37387
- Website: https://isro.gov.in/
- Mission duration: 5 years (planned); 15 years, 5 months and 2 days (in progress)

Spacecraft properties
- Spacecraft: ResourceSat-2
- Bus: IRS-1A
- Manufacturer: Indian Space Research Organisation
- Launch mass: 1,206 kg (2,659 lb)
- Power: 1250 watts

Start of mission
- Launch date: 20 April 2011, 04:42 UTC
- Rocket: Polar Satellite Launch Vehicle, PSLV-C16
- Launch site: Satish Dhawan Space Centre, First Launch Pad (FLP)
- Contractor: Indian Space Research Organisation
- Entered service: 1 July 2011

Orbital parameters
- Reference system: Geocentric orbit
- Regime: Low Earth Orbit
- Perigee altitude: 822 km (511 mi)
- Apogee altitude: 822 km (511 mi)
- Inclination: 98.73°
- Period: 101.35 minutes

Instruments
- Advanced Wide Field Sensor (AWiFS); Linear Imaging Self-Scanning Sensor-3 (LISS-3); Linear Imaging Self-Scanning Sensor-4 (LISS-4)

Resourcesat-2 is a follow on mission to Resourcesat-1 and the eighteenth Indian remote sensing satellite built by Indian Space Research Organisation (ISRO). The new satellite provides the same services as the original Resourcesat-1, but was also designed to "provide data with enhanced multispectral and spatial coverage". Compared to Resourcesat-1, LISS-4 multispectral swath has been enhanced from 23 km to 70 km based on user needs. Suitable changes including miniaturization in payload electronics have been incorporated in Resourcesat-2.

== Launch ==
Resourcesat-2 along with YouthSat and X-Sat (Singapore) was launched by the Polar Satellite Launch Vehicle PSLV-C16 on 20 April 2011, at 04:42 UTC.

== Instruments ==
The satellite carries three electrooptical cameras on board:

- Advanced Wide-Field Sensor (AWiFS) with 56 meter spatial resolution
- The Linear Imaging Self-Scanning Sensor-3 (LISS-3) with 23.5 meter spatial resolution
- The Linear Imaging Self-Scanning Sensor-4 (LISS-4) with 5.8 meter spatial resolution

Additionally, the satellite carries an AIS-receiver for exactEarth (COMDEV), which is known as exactView 2 (EV 2).

== Mission ==
The three cameras of ResourceSat-2, were switched on, on 28 April 2011, and the images of high quality were received at Shadnagar Earth Station of the National Remote Sensing Centre of ISRO.
