= IRS-P3 =

Indian Earth observation satellite

- Names: Indian Remote Sensing satellite-P3
- Mission type: Earth observation
- Operator: ISRO
- COSPAR ID: 1996-017A
- SATCAT no.: 23827
- Website: https://www.isro.gov.in/
- Mission duration: 3 years (planned); 8.5 years (achieved)

Spacecraft properties
- Spacecraft: IRS-P3
- Bus: IRS-1A
- Manufacturer: Indian Space Research Organisation
- Launch mass: 922 kg (2,033 lb)
- Dry mass: 838 kg (1,847 lb)
- Dimensions: 1.56 m x 1.66 m x 1.10 m
- Power: 873 watts

Start of mission
- Launch date: 21 March 1996, 04:53 UTC
- Rocket: Polar Satellite Launch Vehicle, PSLV-D3
- Launch site: Satish Dhawan Space Centre, first launch pad
- Contractor: ISRO
- Entered service: June 1996

End of mission
- Deactivated: 15 October 2004

Orbital parameters
- Reference system: Geocentric orbit
- Regime: Sun-synchronous orbit
- Perigee altitude: 802 km (498 mi)
- Apogee altitude: 848 km (527 mi)
- Inclination: 98.69°
- Period: 101.4 minutes

Instruments
- Multispectral Opto-electronic Scanner (MOS); Indian X-ray Astronomy Experiment (IXAE); Wide-Field Sensor (WiFS)

IRS-P3 was a remote sensing satellite launched by ISRO on board of Polar Satellite Launch Vehicle (PSLV) launch vehicle for remote sensing of Earth's natural resources. It also hosted a scientific instrument, the Indian X-ray Astronomy Experiment (IXAE), for the study of X-ray astronomy. The IRS-P3 satellite contained an X-ray astronomy instrument, a C-band transponder and two remote sensing instruments.

== History ==
IRS-P3 was one of the satellite in the Indian Remote Sensing Programme of Earth observation satellites, assembled, launched and maintained by Indian Space Research Organisation. There was no data recording device on board of the IRS-P3 and data was transmitted in real-time to the ground stationd in Hyderabad, India and Neustrelitz, Germany.

== Instruments ==
IRS-P3 carried two remote sensing instruments and one X-ray astronomy experiment:

- Modular opto-electronic scanner (MOS), which was provided by German Aerospace Center (DLR), in the framework of a cooperative agreement between ISRO and DLR. MOS was designed for ocean remote sensing.
- Indian X-ray astronomy experiment (IXAE). IXAE was to study the time variability and spectral characteristics of cosmic X-ray sources and for detection of transient X-ray sources. The experiment was developed by ISRO Satellite Centre (URSC) and Tata Institute of Fundamental Research (TIFR). The experiment was intended to study periodic and aperiodic intensity variation in galactic/extragalactic X-ray, spectral characteristics of various sources and properties of newly discovered X-ray transients. IXAE instruments consisted of three identical pointed mode proportional counters (PPCs) operated in the energy range 2-20 keV, FOV of 2° x 2° and effective area of 1200 cm^{2}, and an X-ray sky monitor (XSM) operating in the energy range 2-10 keV. The experiment was highly successful and produced more than 30 publications and four PhD thesis.
- Wide-field sensor (WiFS) with additional Short-Wave Infrared band (SWIR). The sensor was designed for vegetation dynamic studies.

== Launch ==
IRS-P3 was launched by the PSLV-D3 launch vehicle on 21 March 1996, at 04:53 UTC, from Satish Dhawan Space Centre, Sriharikota, India. Periodic calibration of Polar Satellite Launch Vehicle tracking radar was located at tracking stations.

== Mission ==
The mission was completed on 15 October 2004 after serving for 8.5 years. With the consecutive successful launches of the PSLV, it was decided not to plan any more Augmented Satellite Launch Vehicle (ASLV) missions.

== See also ==
- Indian Remote Sensing
