= Society of Satellite Professionals International =

The Space & Satellite Professionals International or SSPI is a nonprofit organization, made up of members who work as professionals in the satellite industry throughout their careers. It is headquartered in New York City, United States. SSPI has Chapters and Affiliates in North America, South America, Europe, Asia, and Africa.

== History ==
The Space & Satellite Professionals International was founded in the US in 1983, with Sir Arthur C. Clarke, creator of the satellite concept, as its honorary chairman. It was founded to serve as a professional network in a young industry that was on the verge of substantial growth. Today, SSPI has over 3,000 members in more than 40 nations.

== Awards ==
SSPI currently recognizes individuals and organizations for their contribution to the space industry through five different awards.

- Space & Satellite Hall of Fame: Recognizing individuals whose career accomplishments have shaped the industry of today.
- 20 Under 35: Honoring 20 most promising executives and entrepreneurs of the year age 35 and under in the space and satellite industry.
- Promise and Mentor Awards: To the top three executives and entrepreneurs from each year's 20 Under 35 and the mentors who help them advance.
- Better Satellite World Awards: Honoring established companies and disruptive innovators for continuing to make our world a more prosperous, healthier, better-educated, more sustainable and inclusive home for all humankind.
- Inspire Award: To honor artists in visual, literary, and performing arts whose work has inspired the people of the space and satellite industry.

In 2013, the SSPI included five new members in its Satellite Hall of Fame. They were Romain Bausch, Robert Zitter, Susan Irwin, U. R. Rao, and Dick Tauber.
