= Nilamber Pant =

Indian scientist (born 1931)

- Born: 25 July 1931 (age 95); Almora, Uttarakhand, India
- Occupation: Space scientist
- Known for: Indian space programme
- Awards: Padma Shri; Shri Hari Om Ashram Prerit Dr. Vikram Sarabhai Research Award; Dr. Biren Roy Space Award; Aryabhata Award; Vikram Sarabhai Memorial Award; ISRO Performance Excellence Award; ISRO Lifetime Achievement Award

Nilamber Pant (born 25 July 1931) is an Indian space scientist, a former member of the Space Commission of India and a pioneer of satellite based communication and broadcasting in India. He served at the Satish Dhawan Space Centre and the ISRO Satellite Centre before becoming the vice chairman of the Indian Space Research Organization (ISRO). The Government of India awarded Pant the Padma Shri, the fourth-highest civilian honour in India, in 1984.

== Biography ==
Pant was born in Almora, in the Indian state of Uttarakhand on 25 July 1931 and did his schooling and pre-graduate studies at local institutions in Almora. He graduated from Lucknow University in 1948 and secured his post graduate degree from the same institution in 1952, in Physics with Wireless as a major. Joining the Indian Space Research Organization (ISRO), his first significant task was the establishment of an Experimental Satellite Communication Earth Station (ESCES) at Ahmedabad, a first of its kind in India, in 1965 as a member of the task force entrusted with the responsibility. Later, he completed the first commercial earth station as the Chief Systems Engineer at Arvi, a village around 21 km from Pune, in 1971. During the next five years, he was involved with the development and installation of Satellite Instructional Television Experiment (SITE) at the Earth Stations located in Ahmedabad, Delhi and Amritsar.

Pant served as the director of the Experimental Satellite Communications Earth Station, Ahmedabad and as the chairman of the Communication Area, Space Applications Centre, Ahmedabad before being appointed as the director of the Satish Dhawan Space Centre (SHAR, ISRO) in 1977. It was during his tenure as the director, ISRO that the first four launches of the SLV-3, in 1979, 1980, 1981 and 1983 respectively, were executed under the leadership of A. P. J. Abdul Kalam. His next posting was as the director of the ISRO Satellite Centre at Bengaluru in 1985 where he oversaw the IRS, SROSS and INSAT-2 projects. He also chaired the INSAT-1 Project Management Board during this period. In 1999, he was inducted into the Space Commission of India as a member and the next year, he became the vice chairman of the Indian Space Research Organization, a post he held till his superannuation on 31 July 1991.

Pant received the Shri Hari Om Ashram Prerit Dr. Vikram Sarabhai Research Award in 1976 and the Government of India awarded him the civilian honour of Padma Shri in 1984. The next year, he received the Dr. Biren Roy Space Award from the Aeronautical Society of India and the Aryabhatta Award of the Astronautical Society of India reached him in 1995. At the 92nd Indian Science Congress held at Ahmedabad in 2005, he was awarded the Vikram Sarabhai Memorial Award. The Indian Space Research Organization awarded him the Performance Excellence Award in 2006 and followed it up with the Lifetime Achievement Award in 2010.

== See also ==
- Satish Dhawan Space Centre
- ISRO Satellite Centre
- Indian Space Research Organization
- Rohini (satellite)
