= ISRO Satellite Integration and Testing Establishment =

ISRO spacecraft facility

Agency overview
- Abbreviation: ISITE
- Formed: 2006
- Type: Space agency
- Headquarters: Bangalore, Karnataka
- Website: ISITE website

ISRO Satellite Integration and Testing Establishment (ISITE) (Hindi: इसरो उपग्रह एकता एवं परीक्षण संस्थान) is an integrated satellite testing facility established under the aegis of ISRO Satellite Center by Indian Space Research Organisation in 2006. Started with an area of 1000 sq ft. at the time when the Aryabhatta satellite was launched, the testing facility is spread over 100-acre and can integrate and test six satellites of the INSAT class at different stages simultaneously: 2 communications, 2 remote sensing and 2 foreign satellites. The investment on the facility is so far about Rs 220 crore and ISRO plans to make a further investment of Rs 100 crore. The facility has also carried out vibration and acoustic tests of Mars Orbiter Mission (MOM) spacecraft.

== Facilities ==
The establishment houses four facilities:

- Assembly, integration & test (AIT) clean room - A clean room is of the size of 55x34 metre and with a height of 60 metre, has the capacity to build satellites of 6.5 metre height integrating at least 800 elements. The complete airlock chamber will have temperatures ranging from 1 degree C to 22 degree C and the cleanliness level is 1 lakh class (1 lakh particles permissible per cubic metre).The AIT has an Electro static discharge (ESD) floor to drive away static charges from human body.
- Comprehensive assembly & test vacuum chamber (CATVAC) - It can simulate conditions in space. CATVAC will test the working performance and the balance testing
- Comprehensive assembly and test vibration facility (CATVIB) - A vibration facility which can produce vibrations similar to those that occur during actual launch of spacecraft. The capacity of vibration facility is 29 tons.
- Compact antenna test facility (CATF) - It is a fully automated chamber for spacecraft and antenna testing that will ensure the increasingly travelled path of the radio frequency (RF) energy to find out if the antenna is going to cover the geographical location or not.
- ISITE Acoustic Test Facility - This facility was designed and commissioned by CSIR-National Aerospace Laboratories, Bangalore, for ISRO Satellite Centre (ISAC), Bangalore, on 7 April 2011. A 1500 Cu.m. Isolated Reverberation Chamber, which can qualify satellites up to 156 dB in Nitrogen atmosphere, is the largest and one-of-its kind in India. This facility will be used to perform qualification and acceptance acoustic tests of ISRO's satellites. Prior to this, acoustic tests on satellites were conducted at the ISRO-NAL Acoustic Test Facility located at CSIR-NAL campus. It has its own control room, data room, ground checkout room, air-lock area and air handling units.
- Space Science Instrumentation Facility (SSIF) - It is involved in scientific research and instrumentation, in the areas of astronomy and astrophysics, solar physics, planetary science, and space weather. In addition to this, SSIF is set up to assist external colleges, universities and institutions in the design, development and realization of space-worthy science payloads.

The facility tests on ground all payload packages for such launch-exposed energy fields for their mechanical effects under simulated conditions. The acoustic tests are designed to induce dynamic responses in the test specimen similar to those experienced in flight to qualify them under flight conditions to ensure trouble-free operation. The acoustic shielding efficiency of heat shields is also tested in this facility. Salient Features of the Acoustic Test Facility:

- The 1500 Cu. m Reverberation Chamber (RC) is made of 500mm thick concrete wall with very close dimensional tolerances
- A Helical spring system to carry out modal tests and to minimize vibration transmission to nearby integration area;
- A 175 sq meter air-lock area with 20 ton EOT
- Oxygen sensors with interlocks and alarms
- Adequate clean atmosphere of 100,000 class with AC

== Projects ==
ISITE has been involved in design and development of more than 50 satellites so far of various types namely:scientific, communication and remote sensing. The center is involved in testing of various types of communications and meteorological satellites which are tested after getting fabricated at Space Applications Centre. The Mars Orbiter Mission was also tested here. Some of the other satellites that have undergone testing at the facility are:GSAT-6, GSAT-7 and GSAT-14.

== Collaboration ==
ISRO has planned to support small and mid-sized industries at its 10-year-old second spacecraft complex, the 100-acre ISITE, at Marathahalli in Bengaluru. The facility is already open to suppliers who assemble and test their spacecraft systems for the ISRO. ISRO is hinging on public-private partnership to increase the frequency of satellite launches.
