= EOS-10 =

Earth observation satellite of India

Oceansat-3A
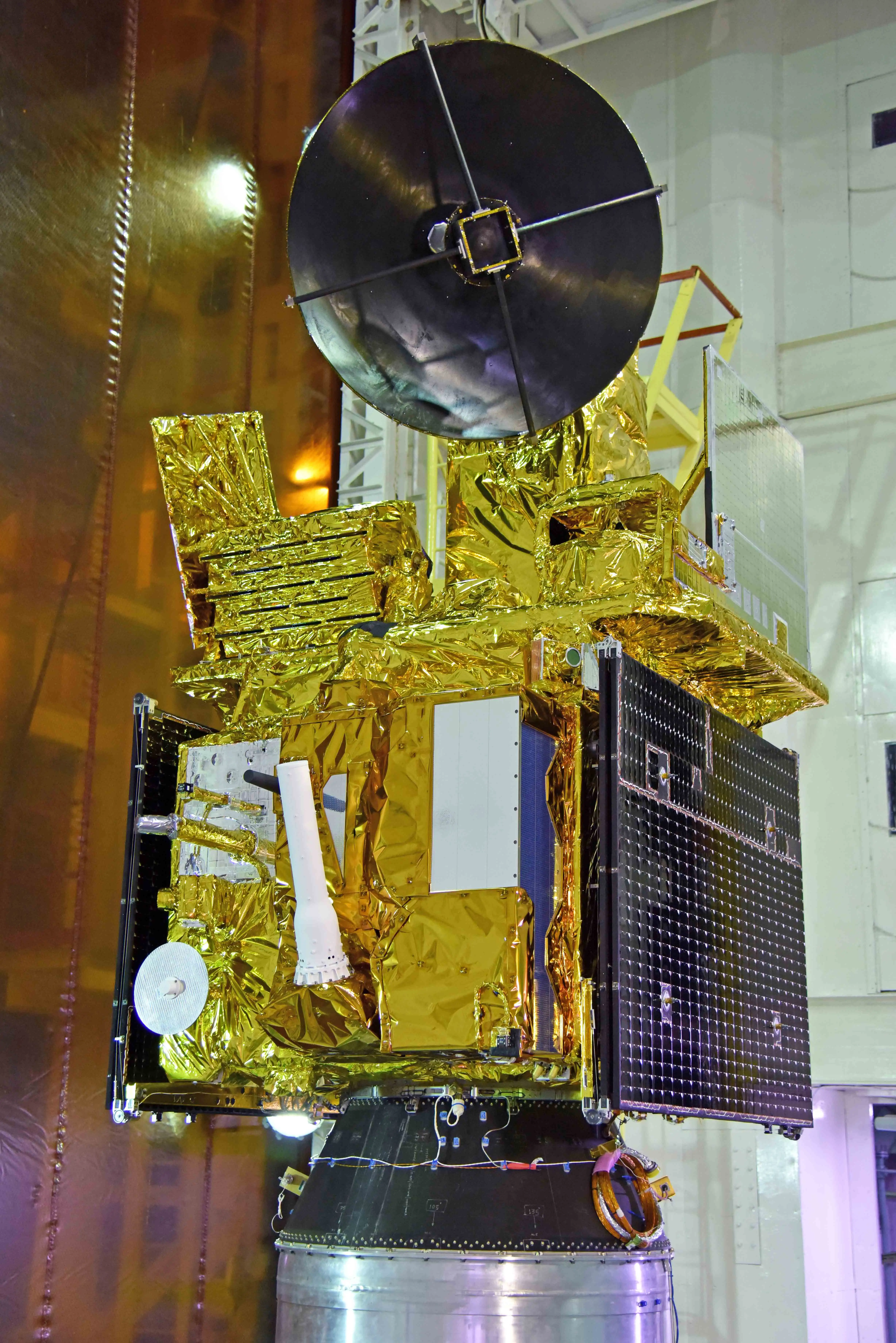
- Image of Oceansat-3 (Oceansat-3A is similar)
- Names: EOS-10 / Oceansat-3A
- Mission type: Earth observation Oceanography
- Operator: ISRO
- Website: https://www.isro.gov.in/

Spacecraft properties
- Spacecraft: OceanSat-3
- Bus: IRS-1
- Manufacturer: ISRO
- Launch mass: 1,117 kg (2,463 lb)

Start of mission
- Launch date: 2026
- Rocket: Polar Satellite Launch Vehicle, (PSLV-N1)
- Launch site: Satish Dhawan Space Centre
- Contractor: ISRO

Orbital parameters
- Reference system: Geocentric orbit
- Regime: Sun-synchronous orbit

Instruments
- Oceansat Scatterometer (OSCAT-3), The Ocean Colour Monitor (OCM-3), a Sea Surface Temperature Monitor (SSTM) and the ARGOS-4 data collection system

EOS-10 (also known as Oceansat-3A) is an Earth observation satellite, which is the fourth satellite in the Oceansat series made by ISRO. It is planned to be launched in Q1 2026 using a PSLV rocket from Satish Dhawan Space Centre. The satellite aims to improve the existing remote sensing capabilities related to the field of oceanography.

== Launch ==
Oceansat-3A will be launched from Satish Dhawan Space Centre in Q1 2026. It will be launched aboard a PSLV-XL rocket configuration, aboard the PSLV-N1 mission along with IMJS (India Mauritius Joint Satellite).
