= U. R. Rao Satellite Centre =

Indian satellite design center

Coordinates: 12.9595°N 77.6546°E

- U. R. Rao Satellite Centre logo

Agency overview
- Formed: 11 May 1972; 54 years ago
- Jurisdiction: Department of Space
- Headquarters: Bengaluru, Karnataka, India
- Employees: 1,339 (as of 1 March 2026)
- Annual budget: See the budget of ISRO
- Agency executive: M. Sankaran, Director
- Parent agency: ISRO
- Website: URSC home page

The U. R. Rao Satellite Centre (URSC), formerly ISRO Satellite Centre (ISAC) is an ISRO centre for the design, development, and construction of Indian satellites. It was established in 1972 as Indian Scientific Satellite Project (ISSP) in Peenya Industrial Estates of Bengaluru. ISAC was renamed as URSC after the former ISRO Chairman and ISAC founding director Dr. Udupi Ramachandra Rao with effect from 2 April 2018. URSC is situated in Vimanapura Post.

URSC/ISRO's GNSS receiver at 9th Bengaluru Space Expo 2026, BIEC

The centre launched its 100th satellite on 12 January 2018, encompassing the INSAT series, the IRS series, and GSAT communication satellites.

Organisations under URSC include the Laboratory for Electro-Optics Systems (LEOS) and the ISRO Satellite Integration and Testing Establishment (ISITE).

== Organisation ==
Like other ISRO centres, URSC is organised using matrix management. The centre is divided into Functional Areas such as Control and Mission Area, Electronic Systems Area, Mechanical Systems Area, and Reliability and Components Area.

Each area is divided into groups. For instance, Control and Mission area has many groups like Control Systems Group, and Flight Dynamics Group. Groups are divided into divisions. For example, Control Systems Group has divisions such as Control Electronics Division, Control Dynamics and Analysis Division.

Project Planning and Evaluation Group, Computer and Information Group, Space Astronomy and Instrumentation Division are independent. Facilities groups like Thermovac facility and projects such as IRS, INSAT, SATNAV operate separately.

== Directors ==
1. Prof Udupi Ramachandra Rao (1976-1984) was the founding director. He was a Padma Bhushan recipient who later became the Chairperson of ISRO and held the post of Chancellor at Indian Institute of Space Science and Technology, Thiruvananthapuram until his last days.
2. Col N. Pant (1984-1990), a Padma Shri recipient
3. Dr K. Kasturirangan (1990-1994), a recipient of the three major civilian awards from the Government of India: the Padma Shri (1982), Padma Bhushan (1992) and Padma Vibhushan (2000). He later became the Chairperson of ISRO
4. Shri R Aravamudan (1994-1997)
5. Dr P. S. Goel (1997-2005), a Padma Shri recipient
6. Dr K. N. Shankara, (2005-2008), a Padma Shri recipient
7. Dr T. K. Alex (2008-2012), a Padma Shri recipient
8. Dr S. K. Shivkumar (2012-2015), a Padma Shri recipient
9. Dr Mylswamy Annadurai (2015-2018), a Padma Shri recipient
10. Dr P. Kunhikrishnan (2018-2021)
11. Shri M. Sankaran (2021-present)
