= GEO Imaging Satellite =

Indian earth observation satellite

Geo Imaging Satellite
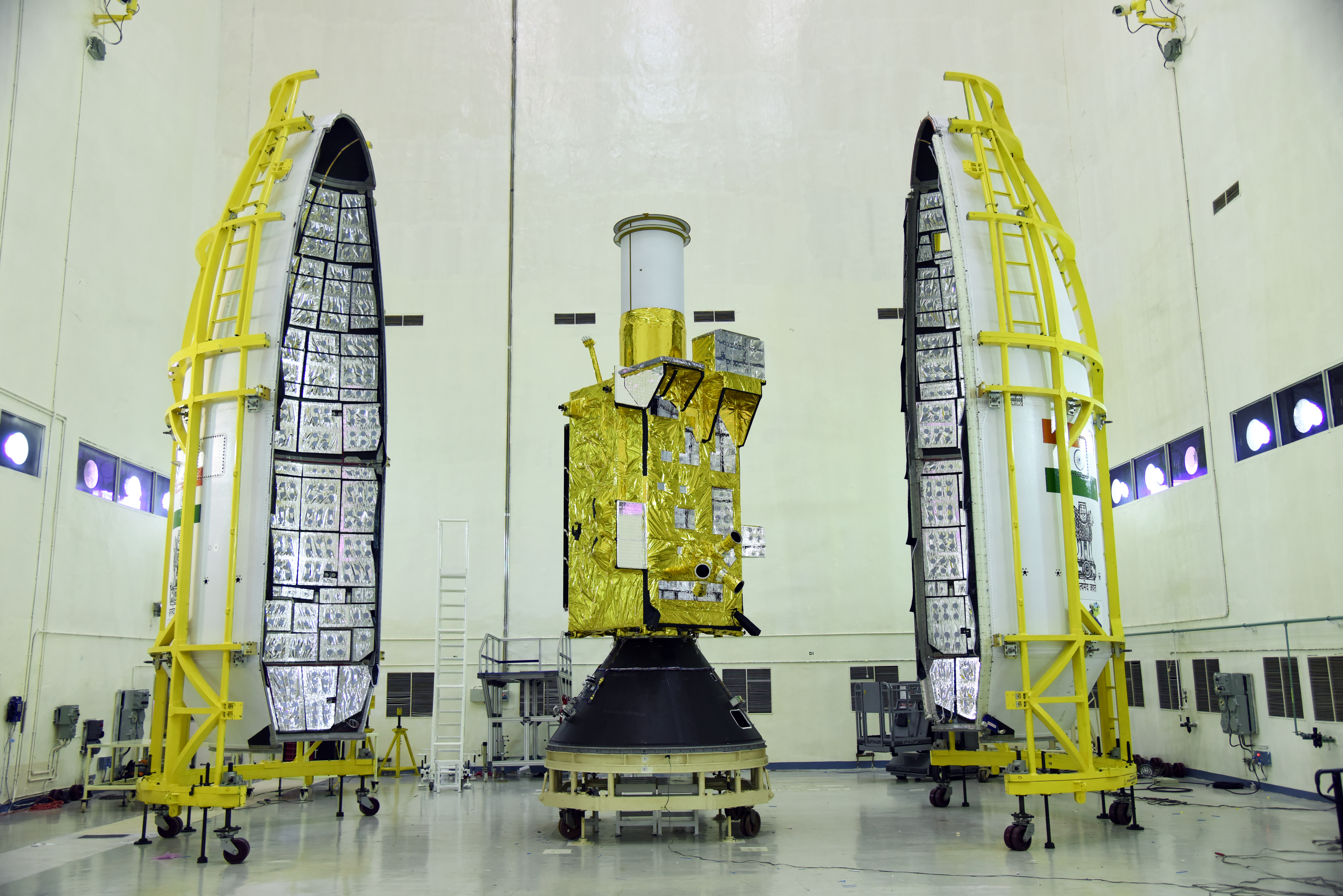
- GISAT-1 spacecraft in the cleanroom before encapsulation.
- Manufacturer: U. R. Rao Satellite Centre; Space Applications Centre
- Country of origin: India
- Operator: ISRO
- Applications: Earth observation

Specifications
- Bus: I-2K
- Launch mass: 2268 kg
- Power: 2280 watts
- Equipment: Ritchey-Chrétien telescope Multispectral array detectors Steerable antenna
- Regime: Geostationary orbit
- Design life: 7 years (planned)

Production
- Status: Planned
- Launched: 2
- Operational: 1
- Failed: 1
- Lost: 0
- Maiden launch: 12 August 2021, 00:13 UTC

Geo Imaging Satellite or GISAT is an Indian imaging satellite class for geostationary orbit with a high temporal resolution, meant for providing near real time imaging with fast revisit capability and real time monitoring. Two satellites will provide resolution in the range of 42 to 318 m. It will carry multi-spectral (Visible and Near-InfraRed, and Short Wave-InfraRed), multi-resolution (42 to 318 m) imaging instruments.

The first satellite; EOS-03 (aka GISAT-1) was launched on 12 August 2021 but failed to reach orbit as cryogenic upper stage of GSLV could not ignite. EOS-3 was supposed to fulfil civilian applications. The second satellite, EOS-05 (aka GISAT-2) will be acquired by Indian Navy and will differ slightly in capabilities compared to EOS-03 (aka GISAT-1).

== Payload ==
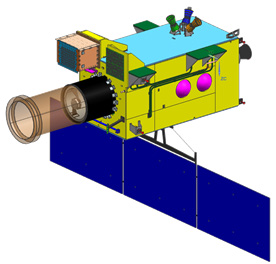
The GISAT-1 in deployed configuration.

GISATs will image in multi-spectral and hyper-spectral bands to provide near real-time pictures of large areas of the country, under cloud-free conditions, at frequent intervals which is, selected field image in every 5 minutes and entire Indian landmass image every 30 minutes at 42 m spatial resolution.

Features of GISAT-1 are:

- 700 mm Ritchey–Chrétien telescope based on the design of Cartosat-2A
- Array detectors in Visible and Near-InfraRed (VNIR), and Short Wave-InfraRed (SWIR) bands
- Electronically steerable, phased array antenna
- High agility, jitter-free platform

Imaging capabilities of GISAT-1
Band	Channels	Ground Resolution(m)	Range(μm)
Multispectral (VNIR)	6	42	0.45 – 0.875
Hyperspectral (VNIR)	158	318	0.375 – 1.0
Hyperspectral (SWIR)	256	191	0.9 – 2.5

== Launch schedule ==
Designation	COSPAR ID	NORAD ID	Power	Launch				Orbital parameters		Remarks
Designation	COSPAR ID	NORAD ID	Power	Launch date, Time (UTC)	Launch mass	Launch vehicle	Launch site	Orbit	Longitude	Remarks
EOS-03 (GISAT-1)	Failed to orbit		2280 watts	12 August 2021, 00:13 UTC	2268 kg	GSLV-F10	SDSC	GTO	85.5° East (planned)	
EOS-05 (GISAT-1A)	2026-202A	100607	2280 watts	3 September 2026, 21:25 UTC	2367 kg	GSLV-F17	SDSC	GTO		
GISAT-2	TBD	TBD	2280 watts	2027 (planned)	2268 kg		SDSC	GTO		

== See also ==
- NAVIC
- INSAT
- GSAT
- Cartosat
- RISAT
- EOS-01
- EOS-04
