= X-Sat =

Microsatellite

X-Sat is a microsatellite developed and built by the Nanyang Technological University (NTU) in collaboration with Defence Science Organisation (DSO) Singapore. The satellite was launched by ISRO's PSLV-C16 on 20 April 2011 from Satish Dhawan Space Centre FLP in Sriharikota, India. The satellite was launched along with Indian ResourceSat-2 and Indo-Russian YouthSat.

== Project Objectives ==
- Create an affordable microsatellite bus that can conduct remote sensing operations in situations close to real-time.
- To increase the nation's capacity (resources and infrastructure) for satellite engineering
- To encourage academic interest in this field's R&D
