= YouthSat =

Satellite

YouthSat is a Russian-Indian scientific-educational artificial satellite developed on the basis of an agreement between the Russian Federal Space Agency and the Indian Space Research Organisation (ISRO). It is built using ISRO's Indian Mini Satellite-1 bus. YouthSat and Resourcesat-2 were launched by Polar Satellite Launch Vehicle on 20 April 2011 from Sriharikota, India.

== Launch ==
The satellite was launched on April 20, 2011, by PSLV-C16. It was injected in its target orbit along with X-Sat (Singapore), 40 seconds after injecting Resourcesat-2.

== Mission ==
- Investigation of the composition of the upper surface of the Earth.
- Experimentation regarding the energy of the Earth's crust.
- To understand the dynamics of the Earth surface.

According to ISRO, "the Youthsat mission intends to investigate the relationship between solar variability and Thermosphere-Ionosphere changes". The mission provided scientific data for two years. Even though the satellite was still operational, YouthSat completed its planned mission on April 25, 2013.
