= P. Kunhikrishnan =

Indian scientist

- Born: 30 May 1961 (age 65); Payyanur, Kannur, Kerala, India
- Education: College of Engineering Trivandrum
- Occupation: Scientist
- Years active: 1986–present

Notes
- Former Director, URSC, Former Director, SDSC-SHAR and Former Mission Director, PSLV

P. Kunhikrishnan (born 30 May 1961) is a Space Scientist from India. Currently, he is a Distinguished Scientist (Apex Scale) & Former Director of U.R.Rao Satellite Centre (URSC), in Bengaluru, India. He was a member of Space Commission, Government of India

== Education ==
Kunhikrishnan completed his Bachelor of Science in Mathematics from Payyanur College in 1981 and later completed BTech in Electronics & Communication Engineering from College of Engineering(CET), Trivandrum in 1986.

== Career ==
Kunhikrishnan joined Indian Space Research Organisation in 1986 after graduating from College of Engineering, Trivandrum(CET). He was part of Systems Reliability Entity at Vikram Sarabhai Space Centre (VSSC) and contributed to various launch vehicle missions starting from ASLV-D1.

He was Associate Project Director for PSLV-C12 & PSLV-C14, Project Director of PSLV-C15 to PSLV-C27 (from the year 2010 to 2015) and Deputy Director of VSSC for Mechanisms, Vehicle Integration and Testing (MVIT).

As a Project Director, he could accomplish 13 consecutive successful PSLV missions including the launch of India's prestigious Mars Orbiter Mission(Mangalyaan) by PSLV-C25.

He served as the Director of Satish Dhawan Space Centre, Sriharikota from 2015-2018. During his tenure, facility upgrades and infrastructure expansions were implemented to increase launch frequency and accommodate growing operational demands.

The 'Visitors Complex' at Sriharikota, that enables 10,000 visitors to witness satellite launches, was conceived and initiated by him during this period.

In 2018, he took over as the Director of U.R.Rao Satellite Centre (URSC), Bengaluru, the lead Centre in the country for design, development and realization of all the satellites of ISRO. As Director of URSC, he was steering the Centre in realising India’s Satellites for national requirements and their operationalization in respective orbits. 13 satellites were launched under his leadership.

He was the Chairman of Working Group of the Whole (WGW) of United Nations Committee on Peaceful Uses of Outer space (UNCOPUOS) headquartered at Vienna.

He is the National President of Indian Society of Systems for Science and Engineering (ISSE).

He is a member of Space Commission, Government of India since Feb, 2020.

== Personal life ==
Kunhikrishnan was born on 30 May 1961 in Payyanur, Kerala as the son of (Late) A K P Chinda Poduval and P Narayani Amma. His wife, Girija is an engineer at Vikram Sarabhai Space Centre (VSSC).His sons are Navaneeth Krishnan and Aravind Krishnan.

Kunhikrishnan is also a trained Indian classical flautist.

== Awards and honors ==
- ISRO Individual Merit Award, 2010
- Astronautical Society of India (ASI) Award, 2011
- ISRO Performance Excellence Award, 2013
- ISRO Team Excellence Award as Team Leader of PSLV C-25/Mars Orbiter Mission, 2013
- Swadeshi Sastra Puraskar, 2013
- Sir CV Raman Memorial award
- IET Eminent Engineer Award, 2020
- Honorary Degree of Doctor of Science from LNCT University, 2021
- Honorary Degree of Doctor of Science from GITAM University, 2019
- Honorary Degree of Doctor of Science by Jawaharlal Nehru Technological University (JNTU), 2016
- ISRO Outstanding Achievement Award for Distinguished service in ISRO, 2018
- Vigyan Pratibha Samman by the Government of Madhya Pradesh, 2017
- Astronautical Society of India (ASI) award, 2011
- National President, Indian Society of Systems for Science & Engineering - ISSE
- Fellow of Indian National Academy of Engineers - INAE
- Fellow of Institution of Electrical & Telecom Engineering - IETE
- Fellow of AP Academy of SciencesChairman, Working Group of the Whole in United Nations Committee on Peaceful Uses of Outer space (UNCOPUOS)
- Co-chair for India-US Civil Space Joint Working Group (CSJWG)
- Co-Chair, ISRO-German working group on space subject.
- Member, International Academy of Astronautics (IAA)
