= EOS-05 =

Earth observation satellite of India

GISAT-1A
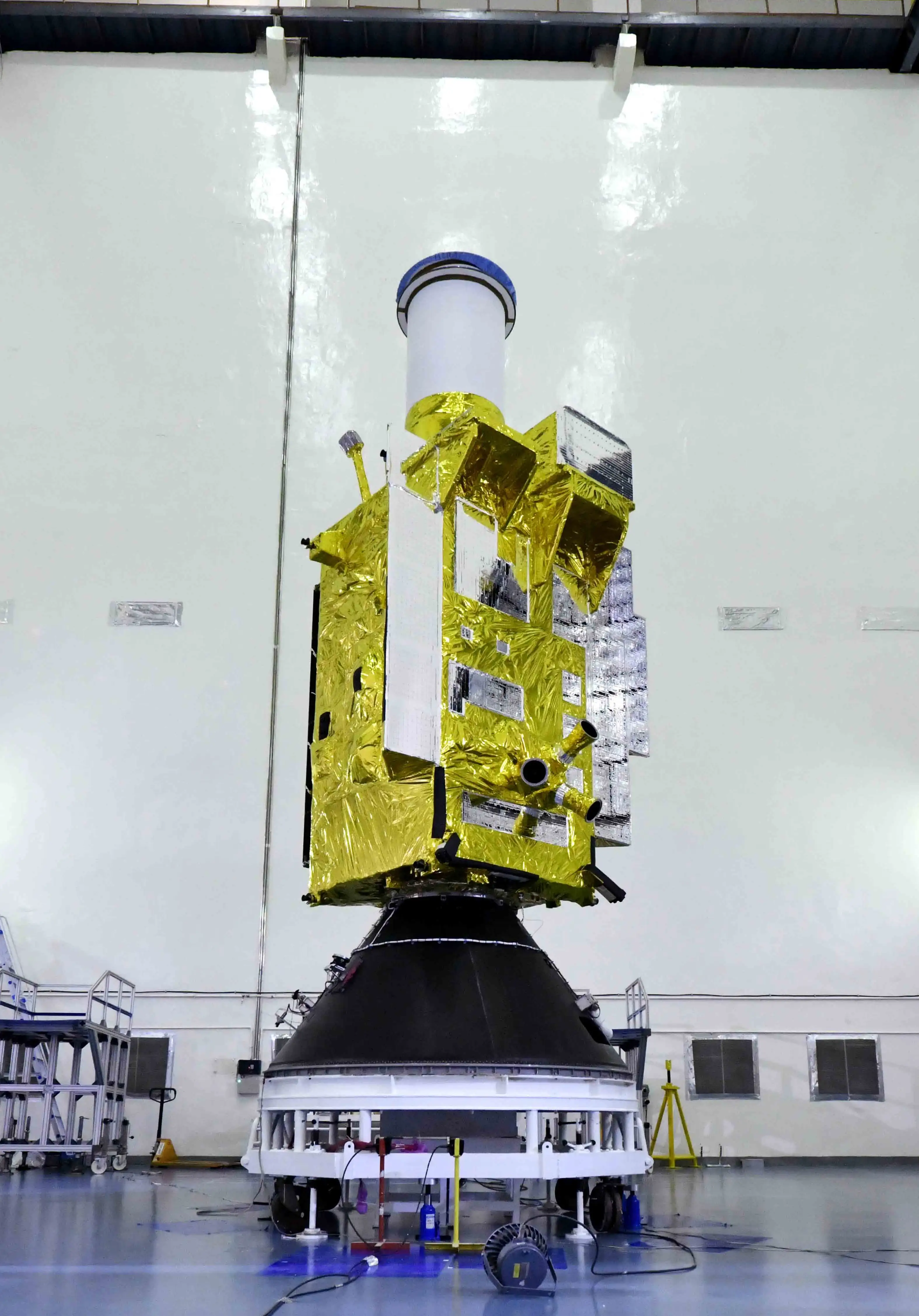
- GISAT-1A in the clean room before encapsulation
- Names: EOS-05 / GISAT-1A
- Mission type: Earth observation
- Operator: ISRO
- COSPAR ID: 2026-202A
- SATCAT no.: 100607
- Website: https://www.isro.gov.in/Mission_GSLVF17.html

Spacecraft properties
- Spacecraft: GISAT
- Bus: I-2K
- Manufacturer: ISRO
- Launch mass: 2,367 kg (5,218 lb)

Start of mission
- Launch date: 3 September 2026, 21:25 UTC
- Rocket: GSLV Mk II (F17)
- Launch site: Satish Dhawan Space Centre, SLP
- Contractor: ISRO

Orbital parameters
- Reference system: Geocentric orbit
- Regime: Geosynchronous orbit

EOS-05 (also known as GISAT-1A) is an Indian Earth observation satellite. It is the second satellite in the GISAT series produced by ISRO. The satellite aims to improve the existing remote sensing capabilities.

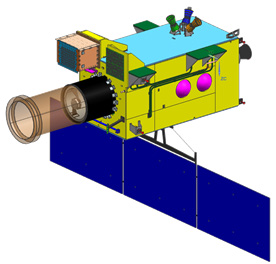
GISAT-1A in deployed configuration

== Objectives ==
GISATs image in multi-spectral and hyper-spectral bands to provide near real-time pictures of large areas of India, under cloud-free conditions, at frequent intervals which is, selected field image in every 5 minutes and entire Indian landmass image every 30 minutes at 42 metres (138 ft) spatial resolution.

These near real-time observations serve for monitoring of natural disasters like cyclones, floods, cloudbursts, and forest fires, as well as for agricultural assessment and security surveillance.

== Instruments ==
- 700 mm Ritchey–Chrétien telescope based on the design of Cartosat-2A
- Array detectors in Visible and Near-InfraRed (VNIR), and Short Wave-InfraRed (SWIR) bands

Imaging capabilities of GISAT-1A
Band	Channels	Ground Resolution(m)	Range(μm)
Multispectral (VNIR)	6	42	0.45 – 0.875
Hyperspectral (VNIR)	158	318	0.375 – 1.0
Hyperspectral (SWIR)	256	191	0.9 – 2.5

== Launch ==
GISAT-1A was launched from Launchpad 2 of the Satish Dhawan Space Centre aboard the GSLV-F17 mission at 2:55 am IST on 4 September 2026. The satellite was placed at the intended Sub-Geosynchronous Transfer Orbit (Sub-GTO) about 18 minutes after lift-off. At 2,637 kg, the satellite is the heaviest satellite launched by GSLV.

On 5 and 6 September, the satellite fired its Liquid Apogee Motor (LAM) engine twice for 5,406.4 seconds (about 90 minutes) until 8:19 pm IST and 5 minutes to reach orbits at 20,000 km × 31,129 km and 35,786 km, respectively. The satellite was originally present at an altitude of 171 km.

On 7 September, the third and final orbit raising manoeuvre to reach its intended geosynchronous orbit with altitudes ranging between 34,903 km × 35,884 km. The LAM engine fired for 1247 seconds until 8:47 pm IST. The health and systems of the satellite will be monitored for the next few days after which the imaging systems will be activated.
