= PSLV-C1 =

- Model of the PSLV rocket
- Mission type: Deployment of one satellite
- Operator: ISRO
- Website: ISRO website
- Mission duration: 1090.52 seconds

Spacecraft properties
- Spacecraft: Polar Satellite Launch Vehicle
- Spacecraft type: Launch vehicle
- Manufacturer: ISRO
- Launch mass: 294,000 kg (648,000 lb)
- Payload mass: 1,250 kg (2,760 lb)

Start of mission
- Launch date: 29 September 1997, 04:47 UTC
- Rocket: PSLV
- Launch site: Sriharikota Launching Range
- Contractor: ISRO

Orbital parameters
- Reference system: Geocentric orbit
- Regime: Sun-synchronous orbit
- Inclination: 98.7°

Payload
- IRS-1D

PSLV-C1 was the overall fourth mission of the Polar Satellite Launch Vehicle (PSLV) program by Indian Space Research Organisation (ISRO). The vehicle carried IRS-1D satellite which was deployed in the Sun-synchronous orbit (SSO). This was India's first launch vehicle built without Russian assistance and PSLV's first operational flight placed IRS-1D into a polar orbit. However, it could not place the satellite in the desired circular orbit but in an elliptical orbit due to a leak of helium gas from one of the components. The mission was termed partial failure since the satellite could not be placed at the desired altitude.

== Mission parameters ==
- Mass:
  - Total liftoff weight: 294,000 kg (648,000 lb)
  - Payload weight: 1,250 kg (2,760 lb)
- Overall height: 44.4 m (146 ft)
- Propellant:
  - Stage 1: Solid HTPB based
  - Stage 2: Liquid UH 25 + N_{2}O_{4}
  - Stage 3: Solid HTPB based
  - Stage 4: Liquid MMH + MON-3
- Altitude: 826 km (513 mi)
- Maximum velocity: 7,436 m/s (24,400 ft/s) (recorded at time of fourth stage cut-off)
- Inclination: 98.7°
- Period: 1090.52 seconds

== Launch ==
PSLV-C1 was launched at 04:47 UTC on 29 September 1997 from Satish Dhawan Space Centre (then called "Sriharikota Launching Range"). The vehicle placed the IRS-1D satellite in the Sun-synchronous orbit.

== See also ==
- Indian Space Research Organisation
- Polar Satellite Launch Vehicle
