= PSLV-D2 =

- Model of the PSLV rocket
- Mission type: Deployment of one satellite.
- Operator: ISRO
- Website: ISRO website

Spacecraft properties
- Spacecraft: Polar Satellite Launch Vehicle
- Spacecraft type: Launch vehicle
- Manufacturer: ISRO
- Launch mass: 295,000 kilograms (650,000 lb)
- Payload mass: 804 kilograms (1,773 lb)

Start of mission
- Launch date: 05:05, October 15, 1994 (IST)
- Rocket: PSLV
- Launch site: Sriharikota Launching Range
- Contractor: ISRO

End of mission
- Disposal: Placed in graveyard orbit
- Deactivated: 15 October 1994

Orbital parameters
- Regime: Sun-synchronous Low Earth orbit

Payload
- IRS-P2

PSLV-D2 was the second mission of the PSLV program by Indian Space Research Organisation. The vehicle carried IRS-P2 satellite which was deployed in the Sun-synchronous Low Earth orbit.

== Launch ==
PSLV-D2 was launched at 5:05 a.m. IST on 15 October 1994 from Satish Dhawan Space Centre (then called "Sriharikota Launching Range"). The vehicle successfully achieved orbit, placing the IRS-P2 satellite in an 820 km Sun-synchronous orbit.

== See also ==
- Indian Space Research Organisation
- Polar Satellite Launch Vehicle
