= IRS-1D =

Indian Earth observation satellite

- Names: Indian Remote Sensing satellite-1D
- Mission type: Earth observation
- Operator: ISRO
- COSPAR ID: 1997-057A
- SATCAT no.: 24971
- Website: https://www.isro.gov.in/
- Mission duration: 3 years (planned); 12 years (achieved)

Spacecraft properties
- Spacecraft: IRS-1D
- Bus: IRS-1A
- Manufacturer: Indian Space Research Organisation
- Launch mass: 1,250 kg (2,760 lb)
- Dry mass: 1,150 kg (2,540 lb)
- Dimensions: 1.65 m x 1.55 m x 2.30 m
- Power: 809 watts

Start of mission
- Launch date: 29 September 1997, 04:47 UTC
- Rocket: Polar Satellite Launch Vehicle, PSLV-C1
- Launch site: Satish Dhawan Space Centre, First Launch Pad (FLP)
- Contractor: Indian Space Research Organisation
- Entered service: December 1997

End of mission
- Deactivated: 15 January 2010

Orbital parameters
- Reference system: Geocentric orbit
- Regime: Sun-synchronous orbit
- Perigee altitude: 740 km (460 mi)
- Apogee altitude: 817 km (508 mi)
- Inclination: 98.6°
- Period: 95.9 minutes

Instruments
- Linear Imaging Self-Scanning Sensor-3 (LISS-3); Panchromatic Camera (PAN); Wide-Field Sensor (WiFS)

IRS-1D is the seventh satellite in Indian Remote Sensing satellite series of Earth Observation satellites, built, launched and maintained by Indian Space Research Organisation (ISRO). The satellite has similar capabilities as that of ISRO's IRS-1C satellite with some improvements added for better imagery particularly in thematic mapping.

== Launch ==
The 1250 kg IRS-1D is an Indian remote sensing Sun-synchronous orbiter that was launched by the PSLV-C1 (Polar Satellite Launch Vehicle) launch vehicle from Sriharikota (in southeast India) at 04:47 UTC. The 44.4 metres, four-stage, 494-ton PSLV-1C is now an operational vehicle, after earlier test launches, it is the fourth launch vehicle PSLV. Orbit maneuvers may be planned to raise the perigee.

Due to a slight under performance of PSLV fourth stage, IRS-1D was injected with a velocity that was 130 m/sec less than the required 7446 m/sec. This minor shortfall in the injection velocity resulted in IRS-1D being injected into a polar orbit with an apogee of 822 km and a perigee of 301 km instead of the intended 817 km circular orbit. But, ISRO scientists, monitoring and controlling the satellite from ISRO Telemetry, Tracking and Command Network (ISTRAC) executed meticulously planned orbit manoeuvres to successfully put IRS-1D into a functional Sun-synchronous orbit of 740 km perigee and 817 km apogee.

== Instruments ==
The satellite carried following instruments on board:

- Linear Imaging Self-Scanning Sensor-3 (LISS-3) of 23.5 m (77 ft) resolution in (VIS / NIR, 70.5 m (231 ft) resolution in short-wave infrared (SWIR), for high-resolution land and vegetation observation
- Panchromatic Camera (PAN) of 5.8 m (19 ft) resolution, for very-high-resolution land imagery
- Wide-Field Sensor (WiFS) of 190 m (620 ft) resolution, for land and vegetation observation

An on board tape recorder stores data over unreachable intervals. Sensed data on Indian and foreign terrains will be sold through an American company (after the usual clearance by Indian military).

== Mission ==
IRS-1D completed its services on 15 January 2010 after serving for 12 years.

== See also ==
- Indian Remote Sensing
