= PSLV-D1 =

- Model of the PSLV rocket
- Mission type: Deployment of one satellite.
- Operator: ISRO
- Website: ISRO website
- Mission duration: 12 minutes

Spacecraft properties
- Spacecraft: Polar Satellite Launch Vehicle
- Spacecraft type: Launch vehicle
- Manufacturer: ISRO
- Launch mass: 295,000 kilograms (650,000 lb)
- Payload mass: 846 kilograms (1,865 lb)

Start of mission
- Launch date: 05:12, September 20, 1993 (IST)
- Rocket: PSLV
- Launch site: Satish Dhawan Space Centre
- Contractor: ISRO

End of mission
- Disposal: Failed
- Deactivated: 20 September 1993

Payload
- IRS-1E (could not be placed in orbit).

PSLV-D1 was the first mission of the PSLV program. The rocket carried IRS-1E satellite but could not deploy it as the mission failed due to a software error in on board guidance and control processor. PSLV-D1 was launched at 5:12 a.m. IST on 20 September 1993. This mission was the only full failed mission under the PSLV program until the launch of PSLV-C39.

== Launch & failure ==
PSLV-D1 was launched at 5:12 a.m. IST on 20 September 1993 from Satish Dhawan Space Centre (then called "Sriharikota Launching Range"). A large disturbance occurred at the point of second stage separation and one of the retro rockets of the second stage failed due to software error in on board guidance and control processor. About 12 minutes after launch, the vehicle fell back to earth and crashed in the Bay of Bengal. The satellite IRS-1E could not be placed in orbit and the mission was a total failure.

== See also ==
- Indian Space Research Organisation
- Polar Satellite Launch Vehicle
