= Oceansat-3 =

Earth observation satellite launched by India

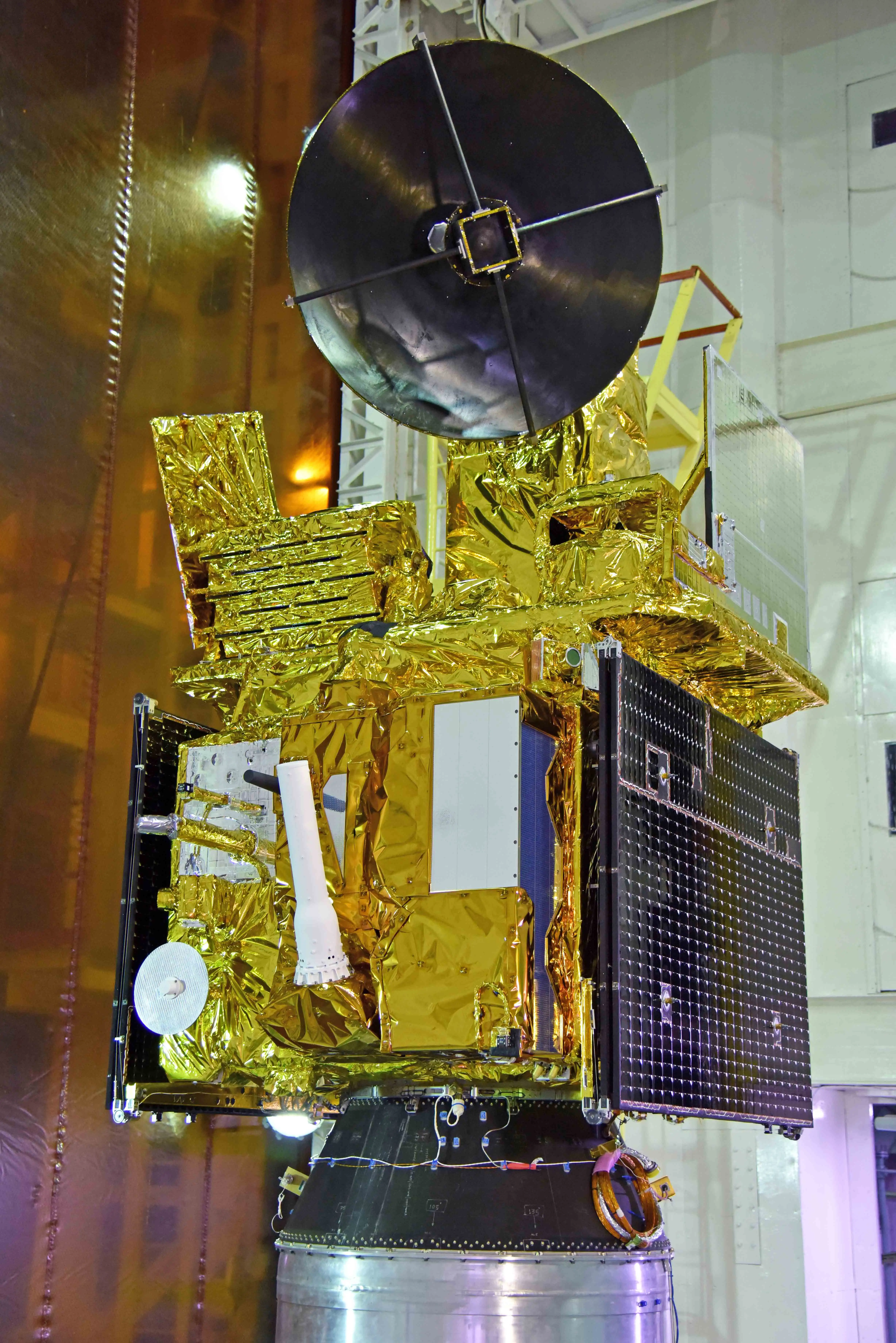
- PSLV-C54, EOS-6 (aka Oceansat-3) - Oceansat-3 on PSLV fourth stage.
- Names: EOS-06 / Oceansat-3
- Mission type: Earth observation Oceanography
- Operator: ISRO
- COSPAR ID: 2022-158A
- SATCAT no.: 54361
- Website: https://www.isro.gov.in/

Spacecraft properties
- Spacecraft: OceanSat-3
- Bus: IRS-1
- Manufacturer: Indian Space Research Organisation
- Launch mass: 1,117 kg (2,463 lb)
- Power: 813 watts

Start of mission
- Launch date: 26 Nov 2022, 06:26 UTC
- Rocket: Polar Satellite Launch Vehicle, (PSLV-C54)
- Launch site: Satish Dhawan Space Centre, First Launch Pad (FLP)
- Contractor: Indian Space Research Organisation
- Entered service: 26 November 2022

Orbital parameters
- Reference system: Geocentric orbit
- Regime: Sun-synchronous orbit
- Perigee altitude: 741.6 km (460.8 mi)
- Apogee altitude: 743.7 km (462.1 mi)
- Inclination: 98.4°
- Period: 99.5 minutes

Instruments
- Oceansat Scatterometer (OSCAT-3), The Ocean Colour Monitor (OCM-3), a Sea Surface Temperature Monitor (SSTM) and the ARGOS-4 data collection system

Oceansat-3 (also known as EOS-06) is an Earth observation satellite, which is the third satellite in the Oceansat series launched by Indian Space Research Organisation (ISRO). It was launched on 26 Nov 2022, 06:26 UTC using a PSLV rocket from Satish Dhawan Space Centre, First Launch Pad (FLP). The satellite aims to improve the existing remote sensing capabilities related to the field of oceanography.

== Launch ==
Oceansat-3 was launched from Satish Dhawan Space Centre at 06:26 UTC on November 26, 2022. It was launched aboard a PSLV rocket of XL configuration, aboard the PSLV-C54 mission along with eight secondary payloads: INS-2B, the Anand satellite, two Thybolt satellites, and four Astrocast satellites.

== Mission operations ==
The Ocean Colour Monitor (OCM) instrument aboard EOS-06 captured Phytoplankton concentration on a global scale survey with a repeat interval of two days in February 2025.
