= PSLV-C54 =

Indian satellite launch mission

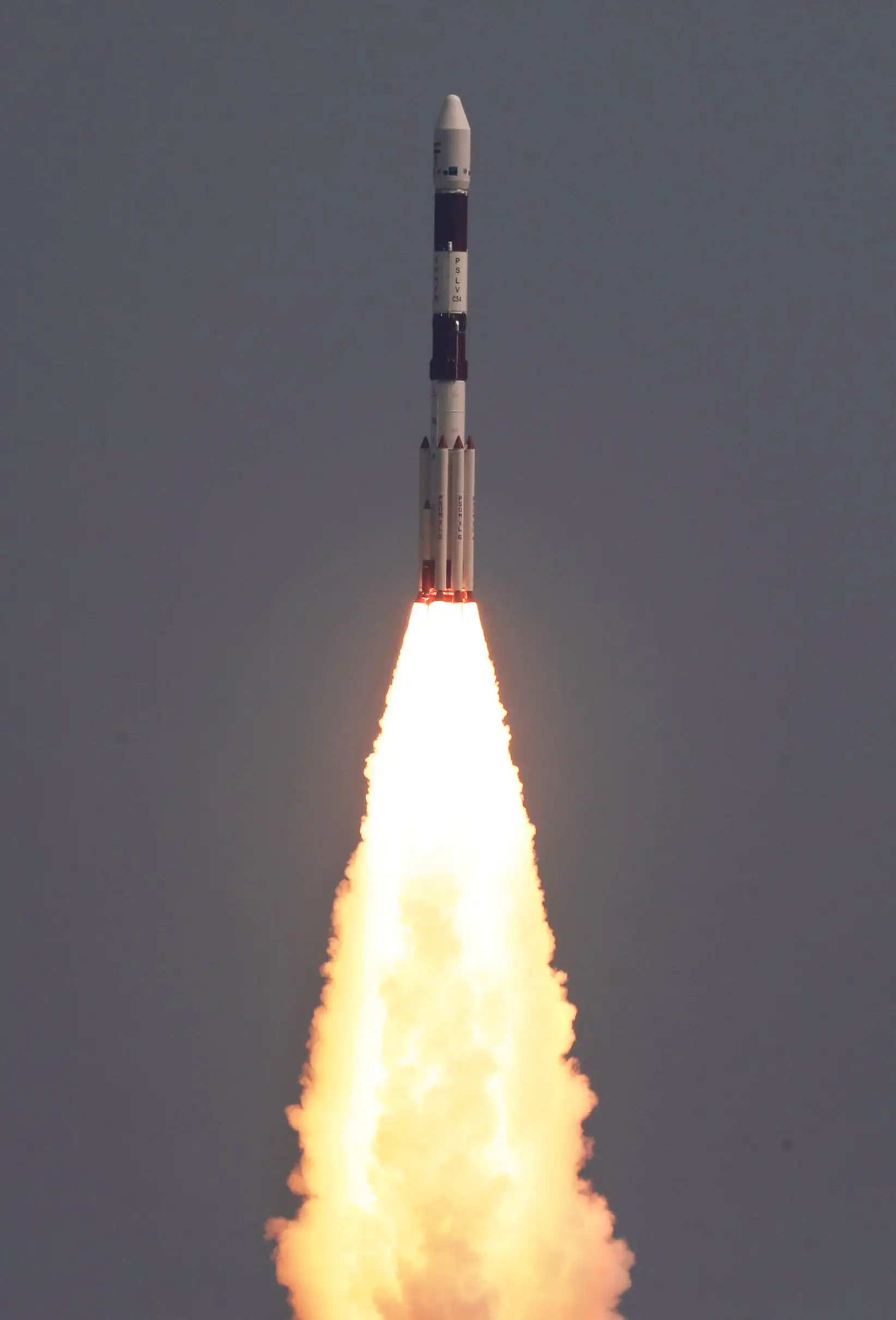
- PSLV-C54 Lifted off from Satish Dhawan Space Center's First Launch Pad.

launch
- Launch: 26 November 2022; 06:26 (UTC)
- Pad: First Launch Pad Satish Dhawan Space Centre
- Payload: (India) Oceansat-3 (Switzerland) 4× Astrocast-2 (India) Dhruva Space's Thybolt-1 & Thybolt-2 (India) (Bhutan) BhutanSat (a.k.a. INS-2B) (India) Pixxel's TD-1 Anand

PSLV launches

The PSLV-C54 was the 56th mission of the Indian Space Research Organisation's Polar Satellite Launch Vehicle (PSLV). It was launched on 26 November 2022 with the Oceansat-3 satellite and Thybolt nanosatellites of Dhruva Space from Satish Dhawan Space Centre, Sriharikota, Andhra Pradesh, India.

== Mission overview ==
- Some Highlights:

Primary payload: EOS-06 (a.k.a. Oceansat-3) (1117 kg) satellite.

Secondary payloads: Eight ride-sharing small satellites.

Mission duration: 125 min. 21.36 sec. (last s/c separation)

Target Orbit 1 : 738 km (SSPO), Inclination = 98.34°

Target Orbit 2 : 511 km (SSPO), Inclination = 97.45°

Two Orbit Change Thrusters (OCT) introduced in the Propulsion Bay Ring.

Launch Azimuth: 140°

PSLV configuration : XL

56th flight of PSLV

24th Flight of PSLV XL

- Propellant:
  - Stage 1: Composite Solid
  - Stage 2: Earth Storable Liquid
  - Stage 3: Composite Solid
  - Stage 4: Earth Storable Liquid

The PSLV C54 rocket has four stages; each one was self-contained, with its own propulsion system, thereby capable of functioning independently. The first and third stages used composite solid propellants, while the second and fourth stage use earth-storable liquid propellant.

== Launch ==
The PSLV-C54 was successfully launched on 26 November 2022 at 11:56 IST / 06:12 UTC.
