= National Natural Resources Management System =

National Natural Resources Management System is an integrated natural resource management system of India which aggregates the data about natural resources from the remote sensing satellites and other conventional techniques. One of the important elements of this management system is the National Resource Information Systems which acts as feeder information system to the larger information system of the Government, which includes socioeconomic information and models. NNRMS activities are co-ordinated at the National level by the Planning Committee of NNRMS (PC-NNRMS) which frames guidelines for implementation of the systems and oversees the progress of remote sensing applications for natural resources management in the country.

== History ==
In the early 1980s, the Planning Commission of India realized the need to set up a system for efficient management of remote sensing data and the conventional data - for management and development of natural resources of the India. To start with the same, a planning committee was constituted in 1982. After some initial experimental work, about 50 end-to-end projects were discussed in the committee and a framework for the NNRMS was outlined. The planning commission adopted several resolutions regarding the establishment of NNRMS. One of the resolution outlined the setting up National Task Forces to address the technical suitability, cost effectiveness, accuracy and the integration of remote sensing data with traditional techniques. The task forces was set up in the fields of Water Resources (Ground and Surface Water), Geology, Soil and Land Use, Urban and Rural Studies, Oceanography/Marine Resources/Coastal Studies, Agriculture, Forestry and Cartographic Representation of Data (CARD The task forces submitted the reports on the current information needs and existing conventional information system role of remote sensing

== Objectives ==
NNRMS carries out the following tasks:

- Mapping of forests and grasslands.
- Monitoring of forest encroachment and shifting cultivation Forest fire surveillance.
- Mapping and monitoring of biosphere reserves.
- Eco-system management related studies for environmentally fragile/sensitive regions like the Himalayas, Western Ghats etc.
- Development of Environment/Forest Resources Information System (ERIS/FRIS).
- Establishment of State Forest Data Management Centres (S17DMCs), with linkages to National System.
- Resources assessment of fuel wood.
- Environmental Impact Assessment (EIA) involving land, water and air pollution
- Environmental hazard related studies (landslide, volcano, earthquake).
- Mapping/monitoring of Coastal Regulation Zone/coastal areas, etc.

== Data sources and sharing ==
NNRMS system aggregates data from the operational remote sensing and meteorological satellites in operation. As of 2016-17, there were 14 Indian satellites that were providing spatial, spectral and temporal data. The data from IRS satellites is received worldwide through a network of International 8 ground stations under commercial agreement with Antrix Corporation To share data with the state governments, five Regional Remote Sensing Service centers have been set up for processing remote sensed data such as Dehradun, Bangalore, Nagpur, Kharagpur and Jodhpur etc.

== Applications ==
NNRMS helps in:

- Identifying zones which could yield ground water and the suitable locations for recharging water
- Monitoring command areas.
- Estimating crop areas and yields
- Assessing deforestation
- Mapping urban areas for planning purposes
- Delineating ocean areas with higher fish catch potential and
- Monitoring of environment and scene specific spot imagery
- Training educationists about GIS technologies.

The agency has executed several projects under National mapping missions wherein mapping and inventory of forests, wastelands, land use, surface water-bodies, wetlands, coastal land use, ground-water targets, urban land use etc. have provided the basis for managing these resources to the different ministries and users.

== Budget allocation ==
National Natural Resources Management System was allocated a budget of ₹ 35 Cr for the year 2016-17 against ₹ 50.10 Cr. allocated in 2015-16.
