= IRS-1C =

Indian Earth observation satellite

- Names: Indian Remote Sensing satellite-1C
- Mission type: Earth observation
- Operator: ISRO
- COSPAR ID: 1995-072A
- SATCAT no.: 23751
- Website: https://www.isro.gov.in/
- Mission duration: 3 years (planned); 10 years (achieved)

Spacecraft properties
- Spacecraft: IRS-1C
- Bus: IRS-1A
- Manufacturer: Indian Space Research Organisation
- Launch mass: 1,250 kg (2,760 lb)
- Dry mass: 1,150 kg (2,540 lb)
- Dimensions: 1.93 m x 1.70 m x 1.65 m
- Power: 809 watts

Start of mission
- Launch date: 28 December 1995; 06:45:18 UTC
- Rocket: Molniya-M (s/n V15000-040)
- Launch site: Baikonur Cosmodrome, Site 31
- Contractor: TsSKB
- Entered service: First week of January 1996

End of mission
- Deactivated: 21 September 2005

Orbital parameters
- Reference system: Geocentric orbit
- Regime: Sun-synchronous orbit
- Perigee altitude: 816 km (507 mi)
- Apogee altitude: 818 km (508 mi)
- Inclination: 98.69°
- Period: 101.2 minutes

Instruments
- Linear Imaging Self-Scanning Sensor-3 (LISS-3); Panchromatic Camera (PAN); Wide-Field Sensor (WiFS)

IRS-1C was the fifth remote sensing Indian satellite built, and designed by Indian Space Research Organization (ISRO). IRS-1C is first second-generation operational Remote Sensing Satellite. The satellite carries payloads with enhanced capabilities like better spatial resolution additional spectral bands, improved repeatability and augment the remote sensing capability of the existing IRS-1A and IRS-1B.

== Objective ==
The primary objective of IRS-1C was to provide systematic and repetitive acquisition of data of the Earth's surface under nearly constant illumination conditions.

== Satellite ==
IRS-1C was the fifth of the Indian natural resource imaging satellites and was launched by a Molniya-M launch vehicle from the Baikonur Cosmodrome. The 1,250 kg (2,760 lb) satellite carried three instruments. Images from regions other than India will be downlinked and distributed through a commercial entity in the United States. IRS-1C used S-band for broadcasting and X-band for uplinking of data. The satellite was equipped with onboard tape recorder with storage capacity of 62 Gigabits.

== Instruments ==
IRS-1C was equipped with three instruments:

- Linear Imaging Self-Scanning Sensor-3 (LISS-3) of 23.5 m (77 ft) resolution in (VIS / NIR, 70.5 m (231 ft) resolution in short-wave infrared (SWIR), for high-resolution land and vegetation observation
- Panchromatic Camera (PAN) of 5.8 m (19 ft) resolution, for very-high-resolution land imagery
- Wide-Field Sensor (WiFS) of 190 m (620 ft) resolution, for land and vegetation observation

== Mission ==
The images was marketed through a private company in the United States. The data transmitted from the satellite was gathered from National Remote Sensing Centre, Hyderabad and EOSAT, a partnership of Hughes Aircraft and RCA.

IRS-1C completed its services on 21 September 2005 after serving for 10 years.

== See also ==
- Indian Remote Sensing
