= IRS-1B =

Indian Earth observation satellite

- Names: Indian Remote Sensing satellite-1B
- Mission type: Earth observation
- Operator: ISRO
- COSPAR ID: 1991-061A
- SATCAT no.: 21688
- Website: https://www.isro.gov.in/
- Mission duration: 3 years (planned); 10 years (achieved)

Spacecraft properties
- Spacecraft: IRS-1B
- Bus: IRS-1
- Manufacturer: Indian Space Research Organisation
- Launch mass: 975 kg (2,150 lb)
- Dry mass: 895 kg (1,973 lb)
- Dimensions: 1.56 m x 1.66 m x 1.10 m
- Power: 600 watts

Start of mission
- Launch date: 29 August 1991, 06:48:43 UTC
- Rocket: Vostok-2M s/n I15000-079
- Launch site: Baikonur Cosmodrome, Site 31
- Contractor: OKB-1
- Entered service: November 1991

End of mission
- Deactivated: 1 July 2001

Orbital parameters
- Reference system: Geocentric orbit
- Regime: Sun-synchronous orbit
- Perigee altitude: 859 km (534 mi)
- Apogee altitude: 915 km (569 mi)
- Inclination: 99.2°
- Period: 102.7 minutes

Instruments
- Linear Imaging Self-Scanning Sensor-1 (LISS-1); Linear Imaging Self-Scanning Sensor-2 (LISS-2)

IRS-1B, Indian Remote Sensing satellite-1B, the second of the series of indigenous state-of-art remote sensing satellites, was successfully launched into a polar Sun-synchronous orbit on 29 August 1991 from the Soviet Cosmodrome at Baikonur. IRS-1B carries two sensors, LISS-1 and LISS-2, with resolutions of 72 m (236 ft) and 36 m (118 ft) respectively with a swath width of about 140 km (87 mi) during each pass over the country. It was a part-operational, part-experimental mission to develop Indian expertise in satellite imagery. It was a successor to the remote sensing mission IRS-1A, both undertaken by the Indian Space Research Organisation (ISRO).

== History ==
IRS-1B was the second remote sensing mission to provide imagery for various land-based applications, such as agriculture, forestry, geology, and hydrology.

== Satellite description ==
Improved features compared to its predecessor (IRS-1A): gyroscope referencing for better orientation sensing, time tagged commanding facility for more flexibility in camera operation and line count information for better data product generation.

The satellite was a box-shaped 1.56 m x 1.66 m x 1.10 metres bus with two Sun-tracking solar panels of 8.5 square metres each. Two nickel-cadmium batteries provided power during eclipses. The three-axis stabilised Sun-synchronous satellite had a 0.4° pitch/roll and 0.5° yaw pointing accuracy provided by a zero-momentum reaction wheel system utilising Earth/Sun/star sensors and gyroscopes.

== Instruments ==
IRS-1B carried two solid state push broom scanner Linear Imaging Self-Scanning Sensor (LISS):

- LISS-1 (72 m (236 ft) each band ground resolution)
- LlSS-2 (36 m (118 ft) each band ground resolution)

The satellite carried two LISS push broom CCD sensors operating in four spectral bands compatible with Landsat Thematic Mapper and Spot HRV data. The bands were 0.45-0.52, 0.52-0.59, 0.62-0.68, and 0.77-0.86 microns. The LISS-1 sensor had four 2048-element CCD imagers with a focal length of 162.2 cm (63.9 in) generating a resolution of 72 m (236 ft) and a 148 km (92 mi) swath width. The LISS-2 sensor had eight 2048-element CCD imagers with a focal length of 324.4 mm (12.77 in) generating a ground resolution of 36 m (118 ft) and a 74 km (46 mi) swath width. The LISS-2 imager bracketed the LISS-1 imager providing a 3 km (1.9 mi) overlap. Data from the LISS-1 were downlinked on S-band at 5.2 Mbps and from the LISS-2 at 10.4 Mbps to the ground station at Shadnagar, India. The satellite was controlled from Bangalore, India.

== Mission ==
IRS-1B was operated in a Sun-synchronous orbit. On 29 August 1991, it had a perigee of 859 km (534 mi), an apogee of 915 km (569 mi), an inclination of 99.2°, and an orbital period of 102.7 minutes.

IRS-1B successfully completed its mission on 1 July 2001, after operating for 10 years.

== See also ==
- Indian Remote Sensing
