= Bhaskara (satellites) =

Indian observations satellites

Bhaskara I
- Mission type: Experimental Remote Sensing; Earth Observation Satellite
- Mission duration: 10 years

Spacecraft properties
- Spacecraft type: Uncrewed
- Manufacturer: ISRO
- Launch mass: 444 kilograms (979 lb)
- Power: 47 watts

Start of mission
- Launch date: 7 June 1979 IST
- Rocket: C-1 Intercosmos Launch Vehicle
- Launch site: Kapustin Yar

Bhaskara-I and -II were two satellites built by the Indian Space Research Organisation that formed India's first low-Earth orbit Earth observation satellite. They collected data on oceanography and hydrology. The satellites are named after the ancient Indian mathematicians Bhāskara I and Bhāskara II. R. M. Vasagam was the project director.

== Bhaskara-I ==
Bhaskara-I, weighing 444 kg at launch, was launched on 7 June 1979 from Kapustin Yar aboard the Intercosmos launch vehicle. It was placed in an orbital perigee and apogee of 394 km and 399 km at an inclination of 50.7°. The satellite consisted of:

- Two television cameras operating in visible (600 nanometre) and near-infrared (800 nanometre) that collected data related to hydrology, forestry and geology.
- Satellite microwave radiometer (SAMIR) operating at 19 and 22 GHz for study of ocean-state, water vapour, liquid water content in the atmosphere, etc.
- An X-ray sky monitor operating in 2-10 keV energy range, to detect transient X-ray sources and monitor long-term spectral and intensity changes in the X-ray sources.

Bhaskara-II
- Mission type: Experimental Remote Sensing; Earth Observation Satellite
- Mission duration: 10 years (Re-Entered in 1991)

Spacecraft properties
- Spacecraft type: Uncrewed
- Manufacturer: ISRO
- Launch mass: 444 kilograms (979 lb)
- Power: 47 watts

Start of mission
- Launch date: 20 November 1981 IST
- Rocket: C-1 Intercosmos Launch Vehicle
- Launch site: Volgograd Launch Station

== Bhaskara-II ==
The satellite provided ocean and land surface data. It orbited at 541 × 557 km with an inclination of 50.7°.

While one of two onboard cameras malfunctioned, the satellite still sent back more than two thousand images. Housekeeping telemetry was received until re-entry in 1991.

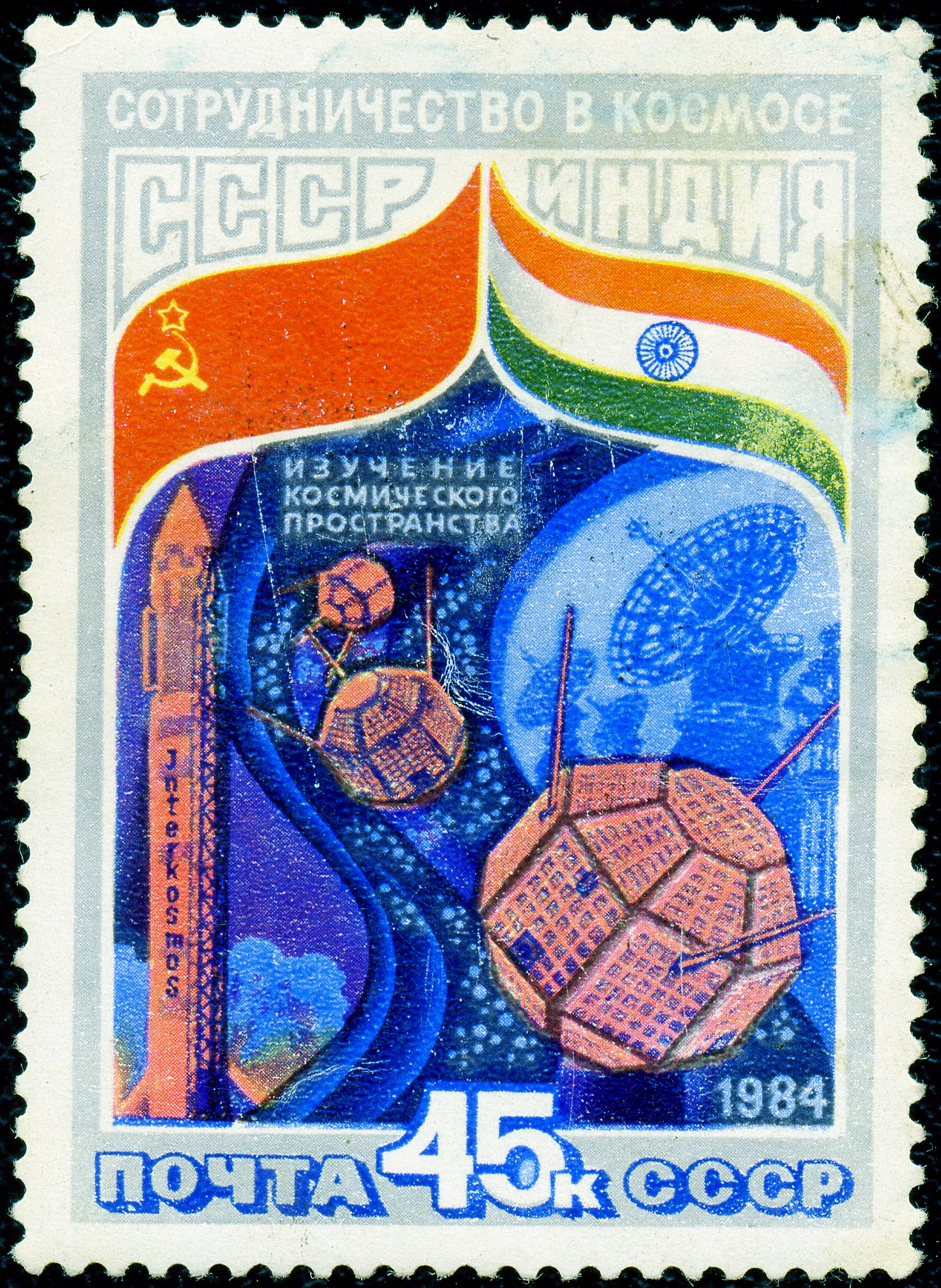
1984 USSR stamp featuring Bhaskara-I, Bhaskara-II and Aryabhata satellites

== See also ==
- List of Indian satellites
