= IRS-1A =

Indian Earth observation satellite

- Names: Indian Remote Sensing satellite-1A
- Mission type: Earth observation
- Operator: ISRO
- COSPAR ID: 1988-021A
- SATCAT no.: 18960
- Website: https://www.isro.gov.in/
- Mission duration: 3 years (planned); 4 years (achieved)

Spacecraft properties
- Spacecraft: IRS-1A
- Bus: IRS-1
- Manufacturer: Indian Space Research Organization
- Launch mass: 975 kg (2,150 lb)
- Dry mass: 895 kg (1,973 lb)
- Dimensions: 1.56 m x 1.66 m x 1.10 m
- Power: 600 watts

Start of mission
- Launch date: 17 March 1988, 06:43:00 UTC
- Rocket: Vostok-2M s/n L15000-79
- Launch site: Baikonur Cosmodrome, Site 31
- Contractor: OKB-1
- Entered service: June 1988

End of mission
- Deactivated: 1 July 1992

Orbital parameters
- Reference system: Geocentric orbit
- Regime: Sun-synchronous orbit
- Perigee altitude: 863 km (536 mi)
- Apogee altitude: 917 km (570 mi)
- Inclination: 99.01°
- Period: 102.7 minutes

Instruments
- Linear Imaging Self-Scanning Sensor-1 (LISS-1); Linear Imaging Self-Scanning Sensor-2 (LISS-2)

IRS-1A, Indian Remote Sensing satellite-1A, the first of the series of indigenous state-of-art remote sensing satellites, was successfully launched into a polar Sun-synchronous orbit on 17 March 1988 from the Soviet Cosmodrome at Baikonur. IRS-1A carries two sensors, LISS-1 and LISS-2, with resolutions of 72 m (236 ft) and 36 m (118 ft) respectively with a swath width of about 140 km (87 mi) during each pass over the country. Undertaken by the Indian Space Research Organisation (ISRO). It was a part-operational, part-experimental mission to develop Indian expertise in satellite imagery.

== History ==
The availability of Landsat imagery created a lot of interest in the science community. The Hyderabad ground station started receiving Landsat data on a regular basis in 1978. The Landsat program with its design and potentials was certainly a great model and yardstick for the IRS programme. IRS-1A was the first remote sensing mission to provide imagery for various land-based applications, such as agriculture, forestry, geology, and hydrology. The mission's long-term objective was to develop indigenous remote sensing capability.

== Satellite description ==
The satellite bus, measuring 1.56 m x 1.66 m x 1.10 metres, had the payload module attached on the top and a deployable solar panels stowed on either side. Attitude control was provided by four-momentum wheels, two magnetic torques, and a thruster system. Together, they gave an estimated accuracy of better than ± 0.10° in all three axes.

== Instruments ==
IRS-1A carried two "Linear Imaging Self-Scanning Sensor", LISS-1 and LISS-2, with a spatial resolution of 72 m (236 ft) and 36 m (118 ft) respectively. The three-axis-stabilised Sun-synchronous satellite carried LISS sensors which performed "push-broom" scanning in visible and near-infrared bands to acquire images of the Earth. Local equatorial crossing time (ECT) was fixed at around 10:30 of the morning.

== Launch ==
IRS-1A was launched on 17 March 1988, at 06:43:00 UTC. It had a perigee of 863 km (536 mi), an apogee of 917 km (570 mi), an inclination of 99.01°, and an orbital period of 102.7 minutes.

== Mission ==
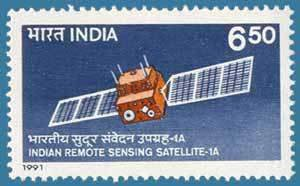
1991 Launch of Indian Remote Sensing Satellite IRS 1A

IRS-1A was operated in a Sun-synchronous orbit. IRS-1A successfully completed its mission on 1 July 1992 after operating for 4 years.

== See also ==
- Indian Remote Sensing
