= Wapowski =

Crater on the Moon

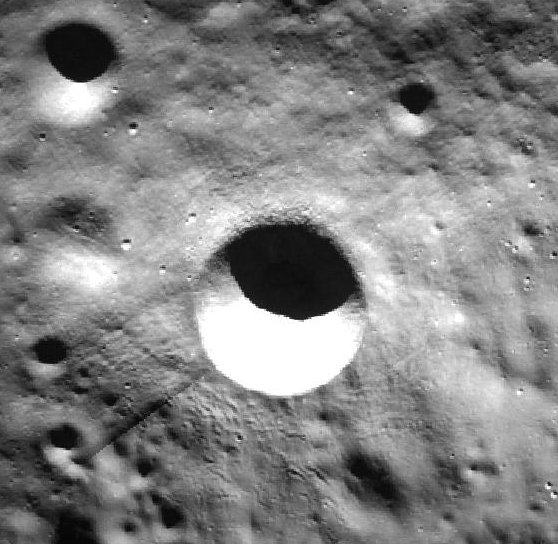
- LROC image of Wapowski (center)
- Coordinates: 82.9°S 53.5°E
- Diameter: 11.6 km
- Depth: 2.64 km (1.64 mi)
- Formation: Eratosthenian
- Eponym: Bernard Wapowski

Wapowski is a lunar impact crater located on the lunar near side near the southern pole. The crater is located Southwest of craters von Baeyer and Svedberg just inside the rim of the prominent Scott crater. Wapowski was adopted and named after Polish cartographer Bernard Wapowski by the IAU in 2009.

This crater dates to the Eratosthenian period on the lunar geologic timescale.
