= List of things named after Hermann von Helmholtz =

Hermann von Helmholtz (1821 – 1894), German physician and physicist who made significant contributions to several widely varied areas of modern science, is the eponym of the topics listed below.

== Astronomy ==
- 11573 Helmholtz
- Kelvin–Helmholtz mechanism
- Helmholtz (lunar crater)

== Mathematics, physics and chemistry ==
- Gibbs–Helmholtz equation
- Helmholtz coil
- Helmholtz condition
- Helmholtz decomposition
  - Helmholtz–Hodge decomposition
  - Helmholtz–Leray decomposition
- Helmholtz equation
  - Kirchhoff–Helmholtz integral
- Helmholtz flow
- Helmholtz free energy
- Helmholtz free entropy
- Kelvin–Helmholtz instability
- Helmholtz layer
- Helmholtz minimum dissipation theorem
- Helmholtz motion
- Helmholtz reciprocity
- Helmholtz resonance
- Helmholtz theorem (classical mechanics)
  - Generalized Helmholtz theorem
- Helmholtz's theorems
- Helmholtz–Kohlrausch effect
- Helmholtz-Smoluchowski equation
- Smith-Helmholtz invariant

== Music ==
- Helmholtz pitch notation
- Helmholtz temperament
- Helmholtz-Ellis notation

== Other ==
- Helmholtz Association of German Research Centres
- Helmholtz machine
- Helmholtz–Thévenin theorem
- Helmholtz Watson, a character in Brave New World

== Physiology ==
- Young–Helmholtz theory
