= Von Baeyer (crater) =

Crater on the Moon

von Baeyer
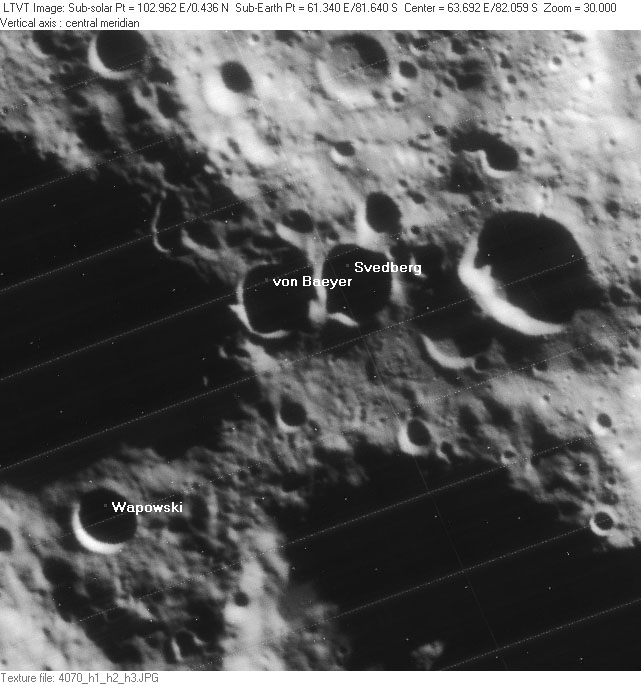
- Coordinates: 81.6°S 61.3°E
- Diameter: 13.8 km
- Eponym: Adolf von Baeyer

von Baeyer is a lunar impact crater located on the lunar near side near the southern pole. The crater is located directly adjacent to Svedberg crater and Northeast and South of prominent craters Scott and Demonax, respectively. Baeyer was adopted and named after German chemist Adolf von Baeyer by the IAU in 2009.
