= Boguslawsky (crater) =

Lunar surface depression

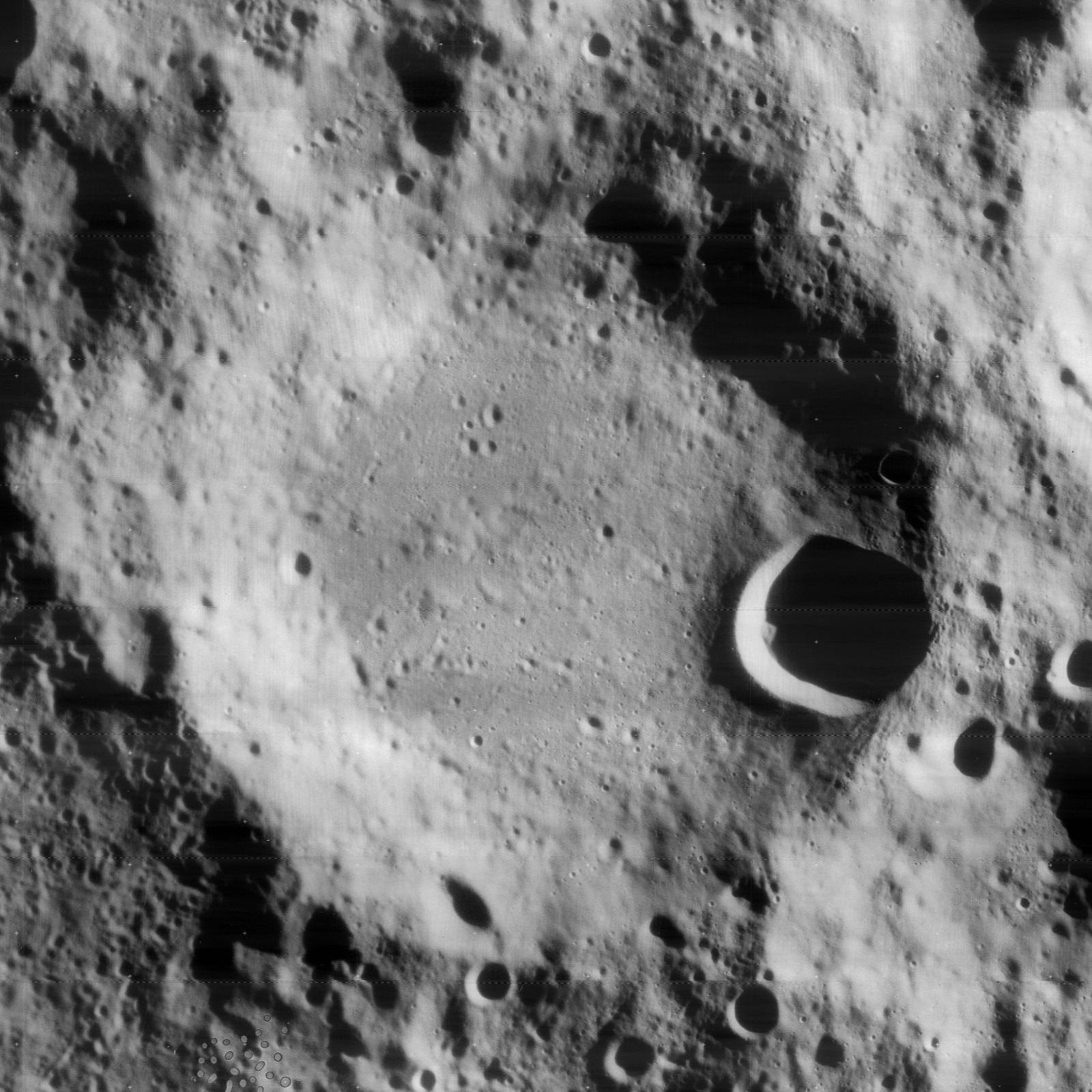
- Lunar Orbiter 4 image with north at top
- Coordinates: 72.9°S 43.2°E
- Diameter: 94.59 km (58.78 mi)
- Depth: 4.02 km (2.50 mi)
- Colongitude: 317° at sunrise
- Formation: Pre-Nectarian
- Eponym: Palon von Boguslawsky

Boguslawsky is a lunar impact crater that is located near the southern lunar limb, to the northwest of the slightly larger crater Demonax, and southwest of the concentric crater Boussingault. Due to its location, this crater appears very oblong in shape because of foreshortening.

On the lunar geologic timescale, this formation dates to the Pre-Nectarian period. The inner walls of this crater are broad and relatively featureless, sloping down to a level surface at the bottom. The floor is flooded and relatively featureless, with only tiny craterless. The rim is somewhat worn and relatively low above the surrounding surface. The crater Boguslawsky D lies across the eastern rim. Despite its location in the southern polar region, no part of this crater is permanently shadowed.

This crater was named after German astronomer Palm Heinrich Ludwig von Boguslawski (1789-1851). Its name was incorporated into lunar nomenclature by German astronomer J. H. von Mädler during the 19th century. This designation was formally adopted by the International Astronomical Union in 1935.

== Exploration ==
The Luna 25 lunar lander mission by Roscosmos was planned to land in the vicinity of crater Boguslawsky. It was launched on 10 August 2023 and it successfully entered lunar orbit six days later. However, on August 19 communications were lost and it was reported to crash on the inner rim of Pontécoulant G crater. If successful, the mission would have sampled and studied the lunar regolith from the upper most layer of the subsurface and measured the content of dust, neutrals and plasma during the cycle of the lunar local time.

== Satellite craters ==
By convention these features are identified on lunar maps by placing the letter on the side of the crater midpoint that is closest to Boguslawsky.

Boguslawsky	Latitude	Longitude	Diameter
A	74.4° S	44.3° E	6 km
B	73.9° S	61.0° E	63 km
C	70.9° S	27.7° E	36 km
D	72.8° S	47.3° E	24 km
E	74.2° S	53.6° E	14 km
F	75.3° S	52.5° E	30 km
G	71.5° S	34.5° E	21 km
H	72.8° S	29.1° E	19 km
J	72.2° S	28.9° E	36 km
K	73.5° S	50.9° E	46 km
L	70.6° S	36.6° E	22 km
M	70.6° S	35.2° E	9 km
N	74.0° S	33.3° E	28 km
