= Neumayer (crater) =

Lunar surface depression

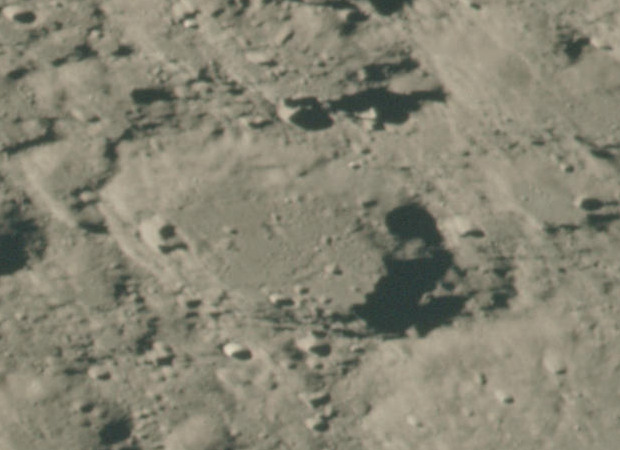
- Oblique Apollo 15 image, facing southwest
- Coordinates: 71.1°S 70.7°E
- Diameter: 76 km
- Depth: Unknown
- Colongitude: 293° at sunrise
- Formation: Nectarian
- Eponym: Georg B. von Neumayer

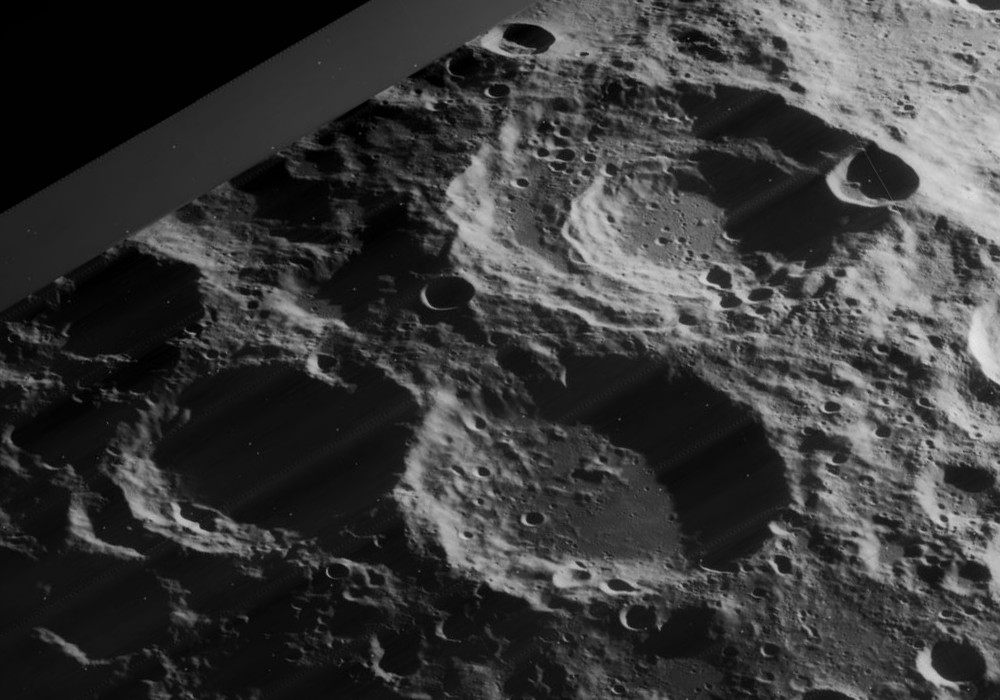
Oblique view of craters Boussingault (above right), Helmholtz (below right), and Neumayer (below left, mostly in shadow), facing southwest, from Lunar Orbiter 4

Neumayer is a lunar impact crater that lies near the southern limb of the Moon. At this location the crater appears much foreshortened and can only be observed during favorable librations. It is attached to the southeastern rim of the slightly larger crater Helmholtz. To the south-southwest is the crater Demonax, and east-southeast is Hale.

This formation dates to the Nectarian period on the lunar geologic timescale. It is a worn crater with features that have been softened and rounded by a history of minor impacts. But the rim remains intact and has not been significantly reshaped or indented by notable craters. The only crater of note within the rim is a small craterlet on the floor near the northern rim. There are much smaller craters scattered across the nearly flat and level floor, but no significant ridges or a central peak. In short, this crater appears as just an old depression in the surface.

== Satellite craters ==
By convention these features are identified on lunar maps by placing the letter on the side of the crater midpoint that is closest to Neumayer.

Neumayer	Latitude	Longitude	Diameter
A	75.0° S	73.6° E	31 km
M	71.6° S	78.5° E	31 km
N	70.4° S	78.7° E	36 km
P	70.6° S	86.0° E	22 km
