= Svedberg (crater) =

Crater on the Moon

- Coordinates: 81.5°S 64.6°E
- Diameter: 14.4 km
- Depth: 3.07 km (1.91 mi)
- Eponym: Theodor Svedberg

Svedberg is a lunar impact crater located on the lunar near side near the southern pole. The crater is located Northeast of Scott crater, adjacent to von Baeyer crater, and South of the prominent crater Demonax. The crater was adopted and named after Swedish chemist Theodor Svedberg by the IAU in 2009.
