= Hermann von Helmholtz =

German physicist and physiologist (1821–1894)

Hermann von Helmholtz ForMemRS
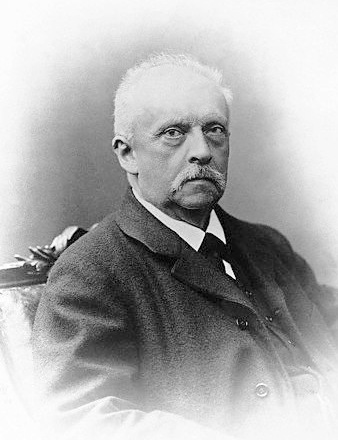
- Born: Hermann Ludwig Ferdinand Helmholtz; 31 August 1821; Potsdam, Province of Brandenburg, Kingdom of Prussia, German Confederation
- Died: 8 September 1894 (aged 73); Charlottenburg, Kingdom of Prussia, German Empire
- Education: Medizinisch-chirurgisches Friedrich-Wilhelm-Institut (MD, 1842)
- Known for: See list: Studies in the conservation of energy; Helmholtz classical theorem; Helmholtz coil; Helmholtz condition; Helmholtz decomposition; Helmholtz equation; Helmholtz free energy; Helmholtz free entropy; Helmholtz layer; Helmholtz minimum dissipation theorem; Helmholtz motion; Helmholtz pitch notation; Helmholtz reciprocity; Helmholtz resonance; Helmholtz temperament; Helmholtz's theorems; Helmholtz–Kohlrausch effect; Helmholtz–Smoluchowski equation; Helmholtz–Ellis notation; Helmholtz–Thévenin theorem; Gibbs–Helmholtz equation; Kelvin–Helmholtz instability; Smith–Helmholtz invariant; Kelvin–Helmholtz mechanism; Young–Helmholtz theory; Additive synthesis; Efference copy; Entoptic phenomenon; Heat death paradox; Hydrodynamic stability; Keratometer; Ophthalmoscopy; Place theory; Prism adaptation; Pure tone; Unconscious inference; Vortex ring
- Spouse: Anna von Mohl (m. 1861)
- Children: 3
- Relatives: Anna Augusta Von Helmholtz-Phelan (grand-niece)
- Awards: ForMemRS (1860); Croonian Medal (1864); Matteucci Medal (1868); Copley Medal (1873); Pour le Mérite (1873); Faraday Lectureship Prize (1881); Albert Medal (1888)
- Scientific career
- Fields: Physics; Physiology
- Workplaces: University of Königsberg (1849–1855); University of Bonn (1855–1858); University of Heidelberg (1858–1871); University of Berlin (1871–1888)
- Thesis: De fabrica systematis nervosi evertebratorum (1842)
- Doctoral advisor: Johannes Peter Müller
- Doctoral students: Heinrich Hertz; Gabriel Lippmann; Otto Lummer; Albert A. Michelson; Max Planck; Mihajlo Pupin; Friedrich Schottky; Arthur Gordon Webster; Max Wien; Wilhelm Wien
- Other notable students: Émile Boutroux; Loránd Eötvös; Johannes von Kries; Edward Nichols; Henry Augustus Rowland; Hans Vaihinger; Wilhelm Wundt

Signature
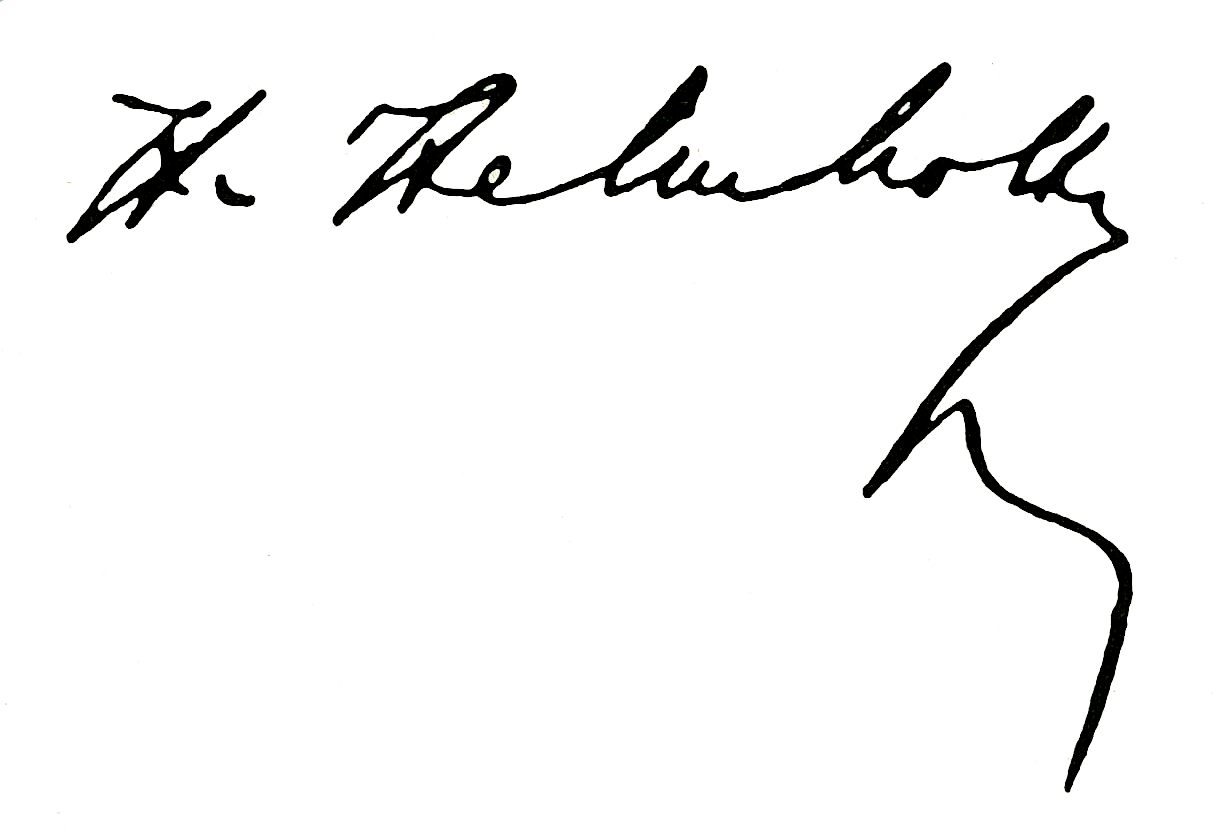

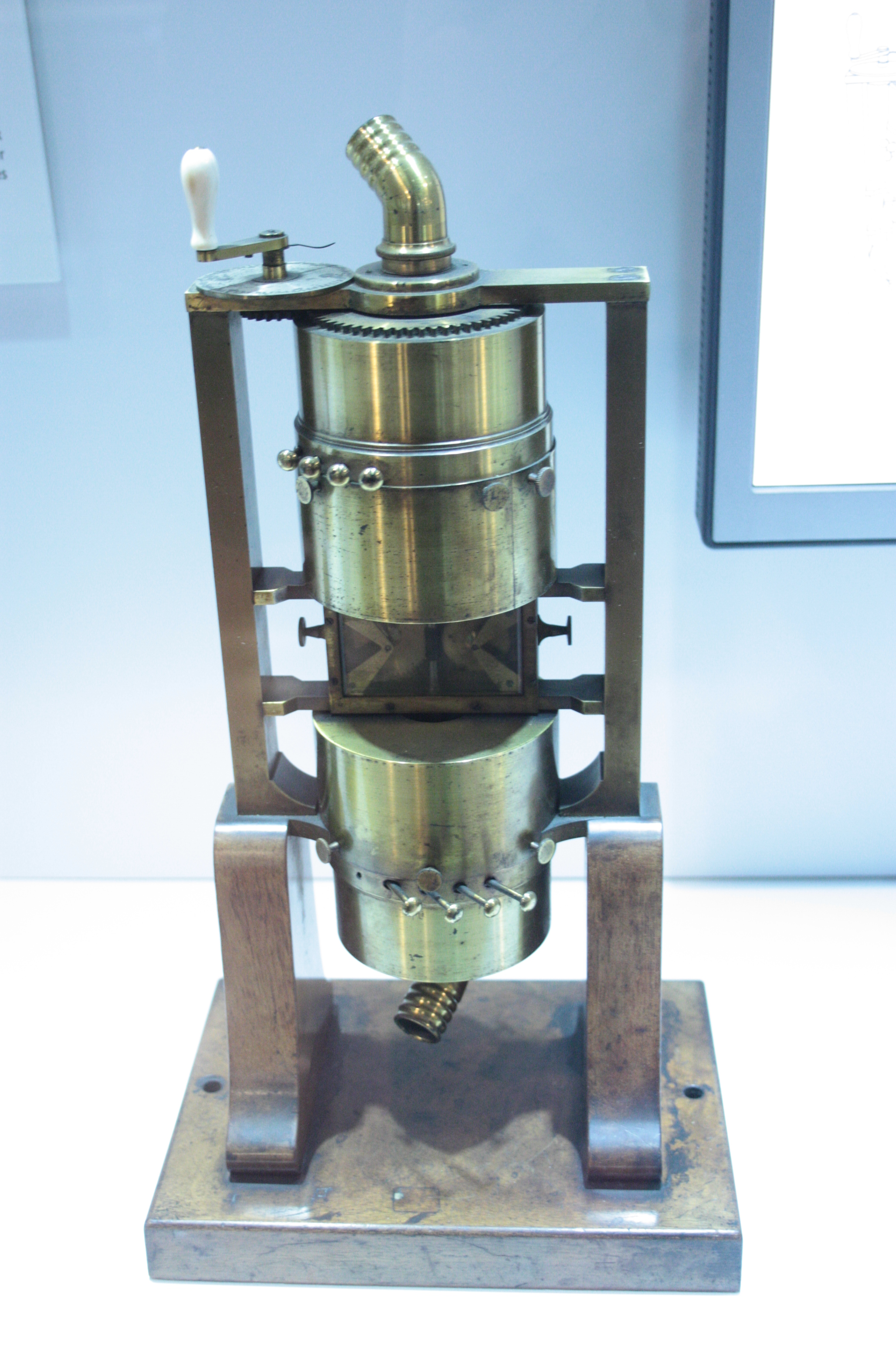
Helmholtz's polyphonic siren, Hunterian Museum, Glasgow

Hermann Ludwig Ferdinand von Helmholtz (Note: /ˈhɛlmhoʊlts/; German: [ˈhɛʁman fɔn ˈhɛlmˌhɔlts]) (31 August 1821 – 8 September 1894; "von" from 1883) was a German physicist and physician who made significant contributions in several scientific fields, particularly hydrodynamic stability. The Helmholtz Association, the largest German association of research institutions, was named in his honour. Helmholtz is remembered for at the time groundbreaking work in natural science linking theory and practical research work. He was given the von in his surname by Emperor William II.

In the fields of physiology and psychology, Helmholtz is known for his mathematics concerning the eye, theories of vision, ideas on the visual perception of space, colour vision research, the sensation of tone, perceptions of sound, and empiricism in the physiology of perception. In physics, he is known for his theories on the conservation of energy and on the electrical double layer, work in electrodynamics, chemical thermodynamics, and on a mechanical foundation of thermodynamics. Although credit is shared with Julius von Mayer, James Joule, and Daniel Bernoulli—among others—for the energy conservation principles that eventually led to the first law of thermodynamics, he is credited with the first formulation of the energy conservation principle in its maximally general form.

As a philosopher, he is known for his philosophy of science, ideas on the relation between the laws of perception and the laws of nature, the science of aesthetics, and ideas on the civilizing power of science. By the late nineteenth century, Helmholtz's development of a broadly Kantian methodology, including the a priori determination of the manifold of possible orientations in perceptual space, had inspired new readings of Kant and contributed to the late modern neo-Kantianism movement in philosophy.

== Career ==
=== Early years ===
Helmholtz was born in Potsdam, the son of the local gymnasium headmaster, Ferdinand Helmholtz, who had studied classical philology and philosophy, and who was a close friend of the publisher and philosopher Immanuel Hermann Fichte. Helmholtz's work was influenced by the philosophy of Johann Gottlieb Fichte and Immanuel Kant. He tried to trace their theories in empirical matters like physiology.

As a young man, Helmholtz was interested in natural science, but his father wanted him to study medicine. Helmholtz earned a medical doctorate at Medizinisch-chirurgisches Friedrich-Wilhelm-Institute in 1842 and served a one-year internship at the Charité hospital (because there was financial support for medical students).

Trained primarily in physiology, Helmholtz wrote on many other topics, ranging from theoretical physics to the age of the Earth, and to the origin of the Solar System.

=== University posts ===
Helmholtz's first academic position was as a teacher of anatomy at the Academy of Arts in Berlin in 1848. He then moved to take a post of associate professor of physiology at the Prussian University of Königsberg, where he was appointed in 1849. In 1855 he accepted a full professorship of anatomy and physiology at the University of Bonn. He was not particularly happy in Bonn, however, and three years later he transferred to the University of Heidelberg, in Baden, where he served as professor of physiology. In 1871 he accepted his final university position, as professor of physics at the Friedrich Wilhelm University in Berlin.

== Research ==
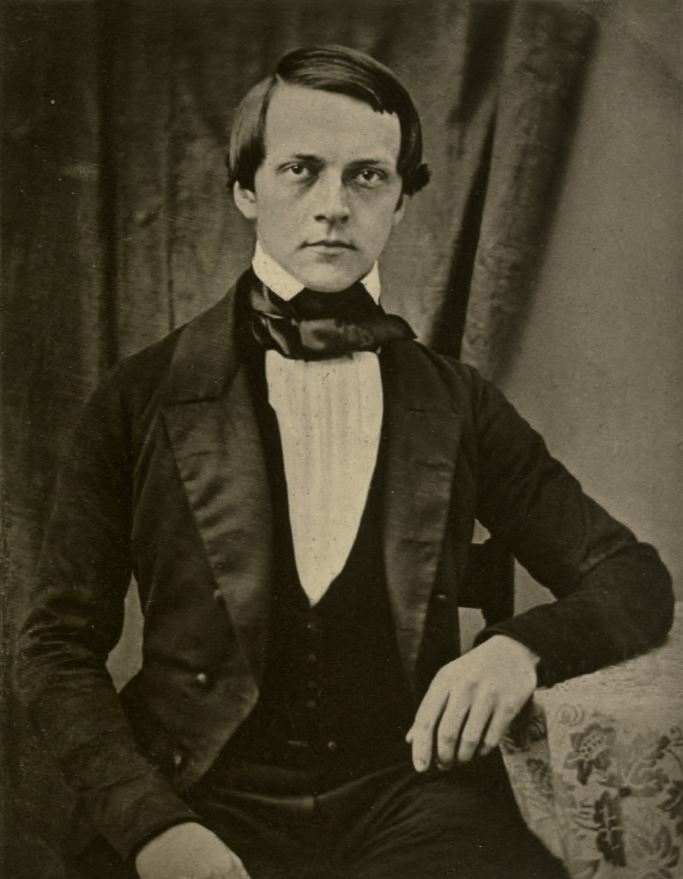
Helmholtz in 1848

=== Mechanics ===
His first important scientific achievement, an 1847 treatise on the conservation of energy, was written in the context of his medical studies and philosophical background. His work on energy conservation came about while studying muscle metabolism. He tried to demonstrate that no energy is lost in muscle movement, motivated by the implication that there were no vital forces necessary to move a muscle. This was a rejection of the speculative tradition of Naturphilosophie and vitalism which was at that time a dominant philosophical paradigm in German physiology. He was working against the argument, promoted by some vitalists, that "living force" can power a machine indefinitely.

Drawing on the earlier work of Sadi Carnot, Benoît Paul Émile Clapeyron and James Prescott Joule, he postulated a relationship between mechanics, heat, light, electricity and magnetism by treating them all as manifestations of a single force, or energy in today's terminology. He published his theories in his book Über die Erhaltung der Kraft (On the Conservation of Force, 1847).

In the 1850s and 60s, building on the publications of William Thomson, Helmholtz and William Rankine helped popularize the idea of the heat death of the universe.

In fluid dynamics, Helmholtz made several contributions, including Helmholtz's theorems for vortex dynamics in inviscid fluids.

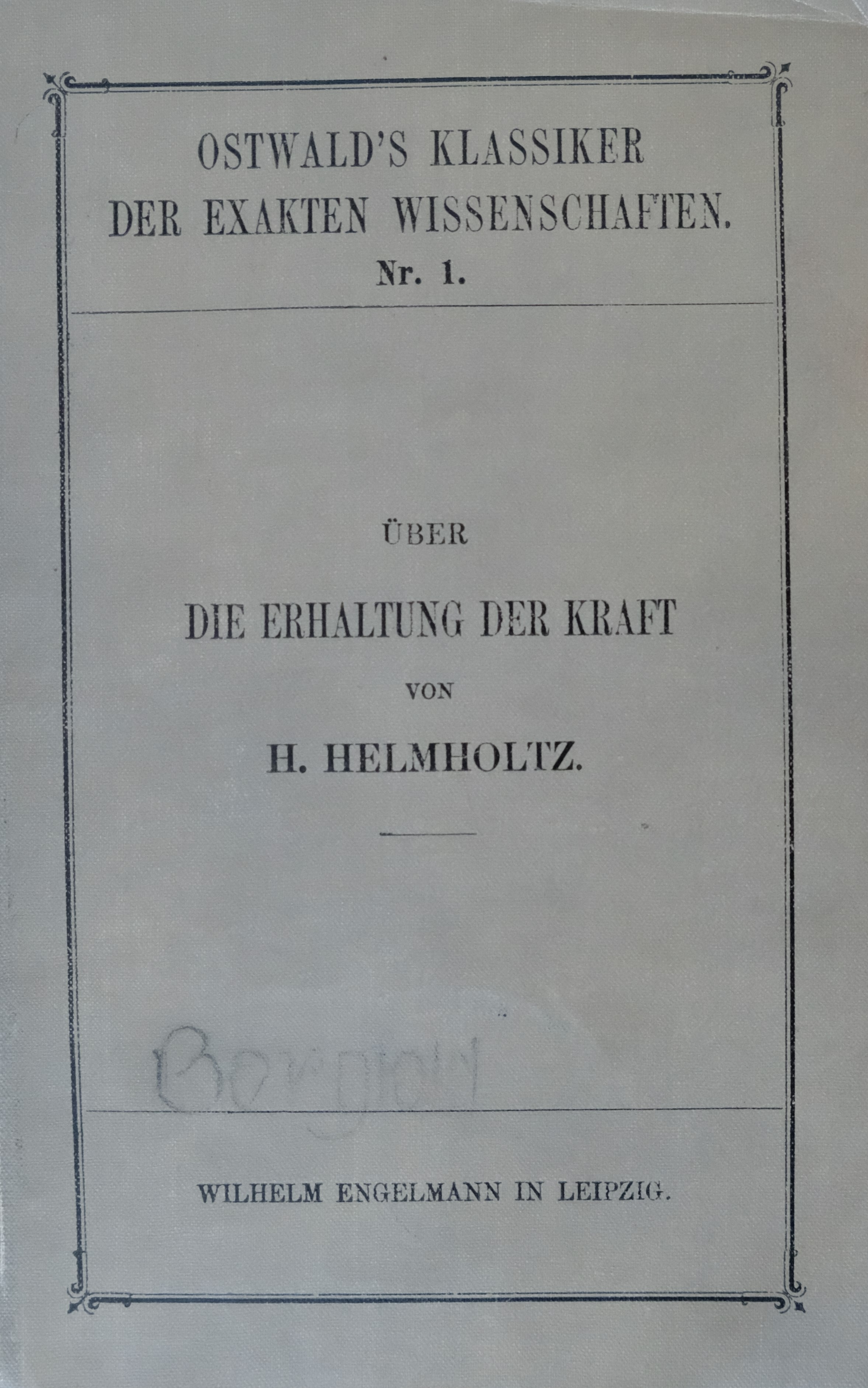
1889 copy of Helmholtz's "Über die Erhaltung der Kraft", no. 1

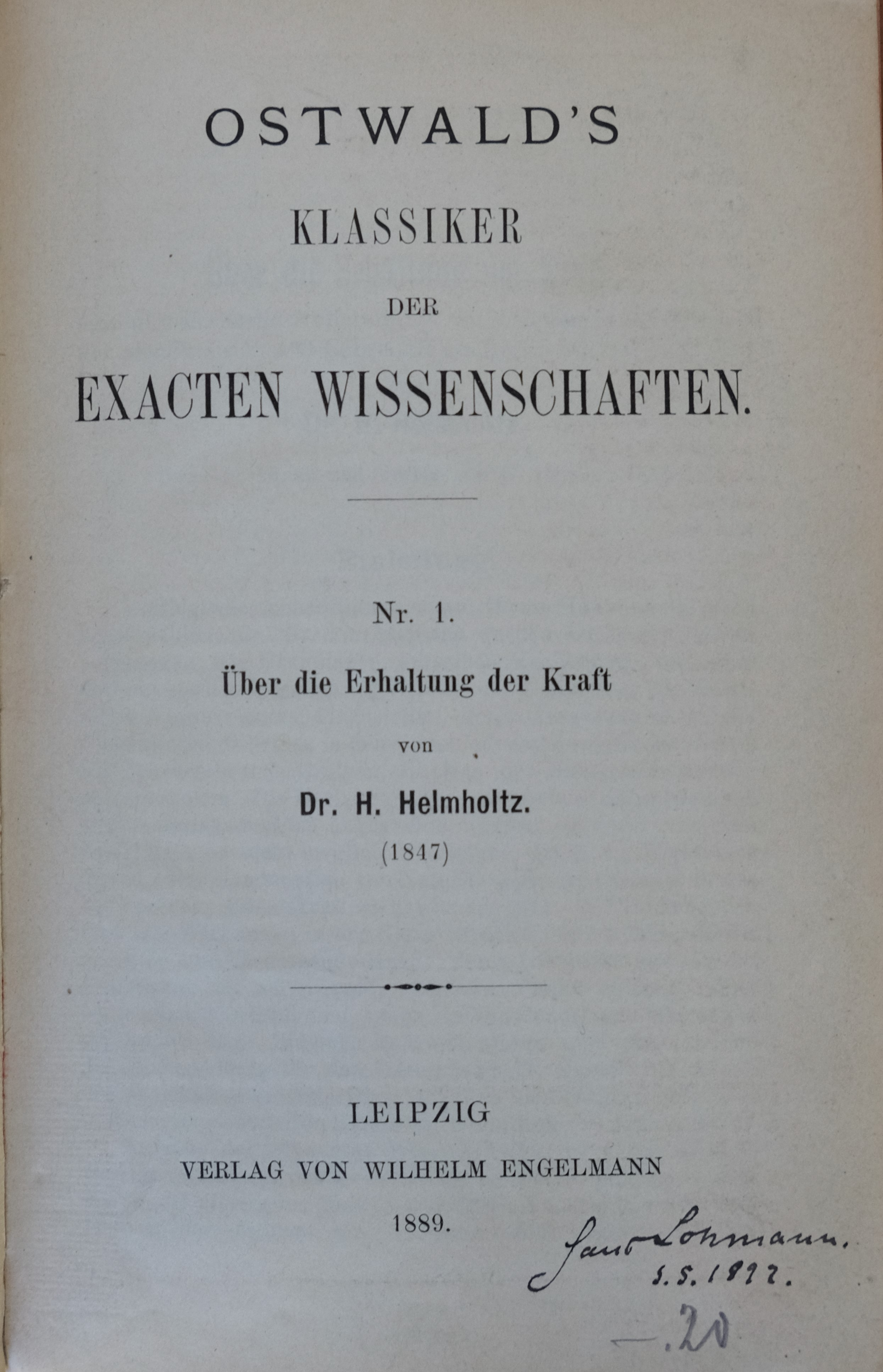
Title page of "Über die Erhaltung der Kraft", no. 1

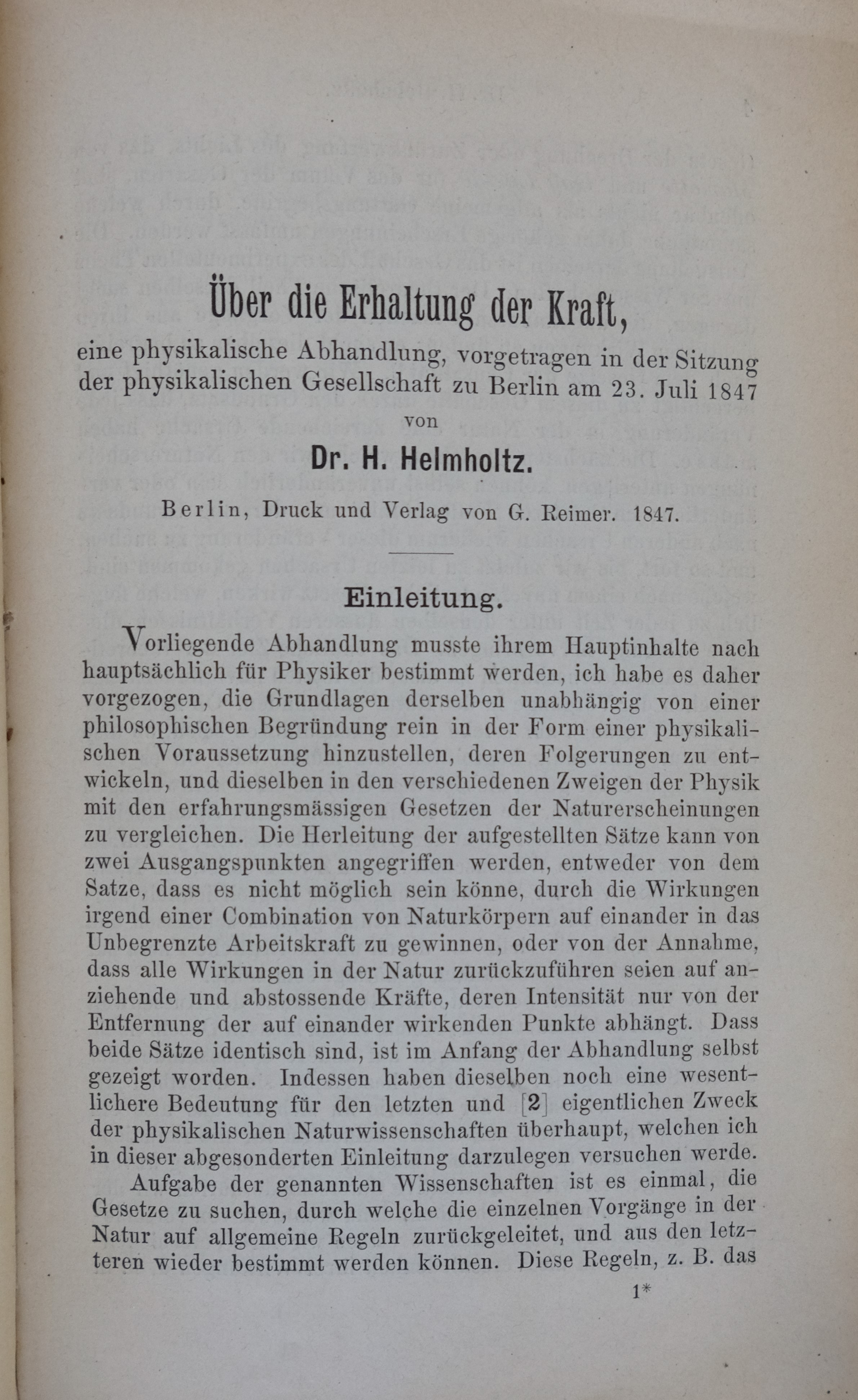
First page of "Über die Erhaltung der Kraft", no. 1

=== Sensory physiology ===
Helmholtz was a pioneer in the scientific study of human vision and audition. Inspired by psychophysics, he was interested in the relationships between measurable physical stimuli and their correspondent human perceptions. For example, the amplitude of a sound wave can be varied, causing the sound to appear louder or softer, but a linear step in sound pressure amplitude does not result in a linear step in perceived loudness. The physical sound needs to be increased exponentially in order for equal steps to seem linear, a fact that is used in current electronic devices to control volume. Helmholtz paved the way in experimental studies on the relationship between the physical energy (physics) and its appreciation (psychology), with the goal in mind to develop "psychophysical laws".

The sensory physiology of Helmholtz was the basis of the work of Wilhelm Wundt, Helmholtz's student, who is considered one of the founders of experimental psychology. More explicitly than Helmholtz, Wundt described his research as a form of empirical philosophy and as a study of the mind as something separate. Helmholtz had, in his early repudiation of Naturphilosophie, stressed the importance of materialism, and was focusing more on the unity of "mind" and body.

=== Ophthalmic optics ===
In 1851, Helmholtz revolutionized the field of ophthalmology with the invention of the ophthalmoscope; an instrument used to examine the inside of the human eye. This made him world-famous overnight. Helmholtz's interests at that time were increasingly focused on the physiology of the senses. His main publication, titled Handbuch der Physiologischen Optik (Handbook of Physiological Optics or Treatise on Physiological Optics; English translation of the 3rd volume here), provided empirical theories on depth perception, colour vision, and motion perception, and became the fundamental reference work in his field during the second half of the nineteenth century. In the third and final volume, published in 1867, Helmholtz described the importance of unconscious inferences for perception. The Handbuch was first translated into English under the editorship of James P. C. Southall on behalf of the Optical Society of America in 1924–5. His theory of accommodation went unchallenged until the final decade of the 20th century.

Helmholtz continued to work for several decades on several editions of the handbook, frequently updating his work because of his dispute with Ewald Hering who held opposite views on spatial and colour vision. This dispute divided the discipline of physiology during the second half of the 1800s.

=== Nerve physiology ===
In 1849, while at Königsberg, Helmholtz measured the speed at which the signal is carried along a nerve fibre. At that time most people believed that nerve signals passed along nerves immeasurably fast. He used a recently dissected sciatic nerve of a frog and the calf muscle to which it attached. He used a galvanometer as a sensitive timing device, attaching a mirror to the needle to reflect a light beam across the room to a scale which gave much greater sensitivity. Helmholtz reported transmission speeds in the range of 24.6 – 38.4 meters per second.

=== Acoustics and aesthetics ===
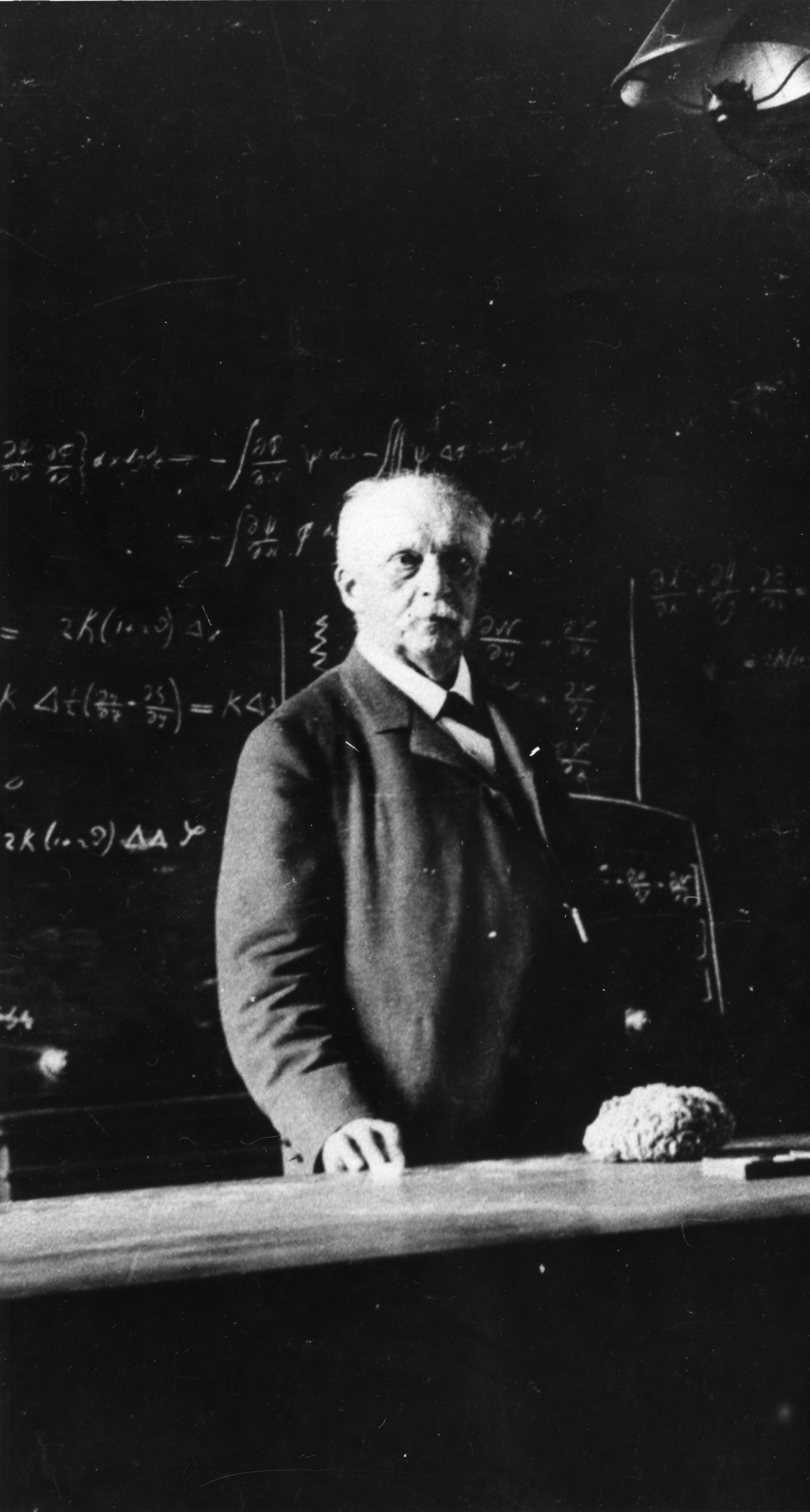
Last photograph of von Helmholtz, taken three days before his final illness

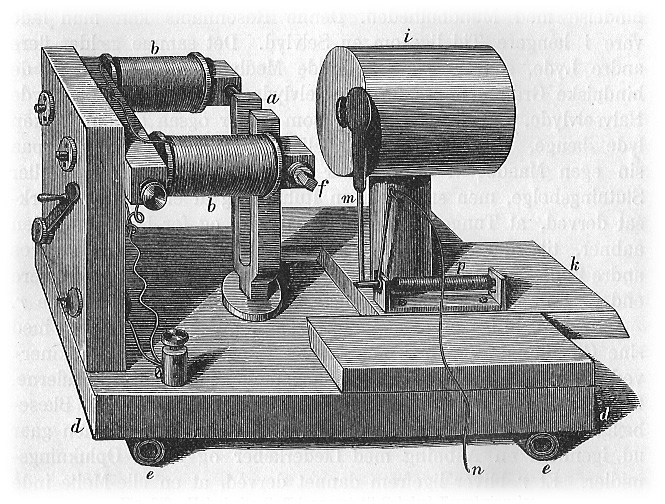
The Helmholtz resonator (i) and instrumentation

In 1863, Helmholtz published Sensations of Tone, once again demonstrating his interest in the physics of perception. This book influenced musicologists into the twentieth century. Helmholtz invented the Helmholtz resonator to identify the various frequencies or pitches of the pure sine wave components of complex sounds containing multiple tones.

Helmholtz showed that different combinations of resonators could mimic vowel sounds: Alexander Graham Bell in particular was interested in this but, not being able to read German, misconstrued Helmholtz's diagrams as meaning that Helmholtz had transmitted multiple frequencies by wire—which would allow multiplexing of telegraph signals—whereas, in reality, electrical power was used only to keep the resonators in motion. Bell failed to reproduce what he thought Helmholtz had done but later said that, had he been able to read German, he would not have gone on to invent the telephone on the harmonic telegraph principle.

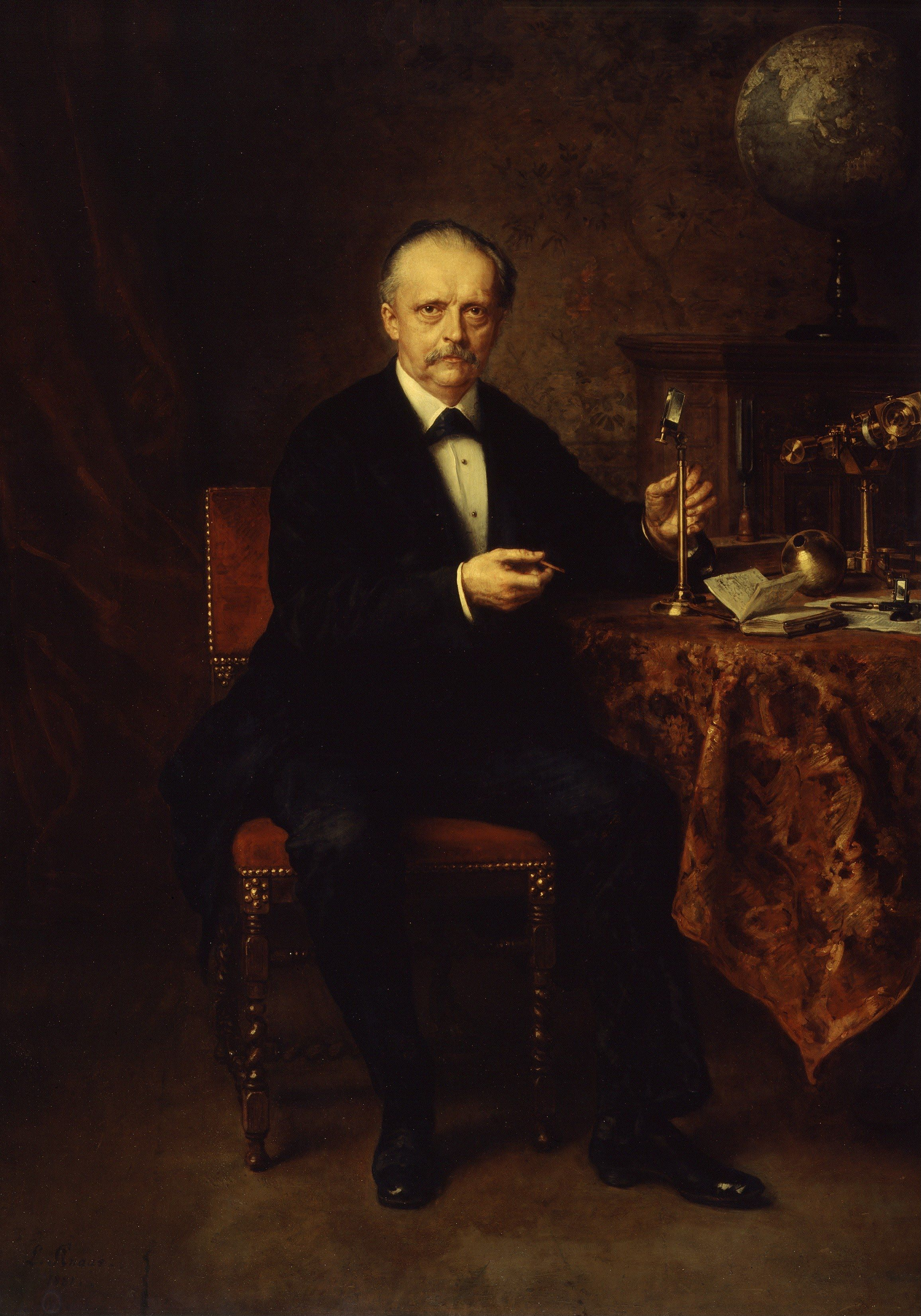
Helmholtz in 1881, portrait by Ludwig Knaus

The translation by Alexander J. Ellis was first published in 1875 (the first English edition was from the 1870 third German edition; Ellis's second English edition from the 1877 fourth German edition was published in 1885; the 1895 and 1912 third and fourth English editions were reprints of the second).

=== Electromagnetism ===
Helmholtz studied electrical oscillations from 1869 to 1871, and in a lecture delivered to the Naturhistorisch-medizinischen Verein zu Heidelberg (Natural History and Medical Association of Heidelberg) on 30 April 1869, titled On Electrical Oscillations, he indicated that the perceptible damped electrical oscillations in a coil connected to a Leyden jar were about 1/50 second in duration.

In 1871, Helmholtz moved from Heidelberg to Berlin to become a professor of physics. He became interested in electromagnetism, and the Helmholtz equation is named for him. Although he made no major contributions to this field, his student Heinrich Rudolf Hertz became famous as the first to demonstrate electromagnetic radiation. Oliver Heaviside criticised Helmholtz's electromagnetic theory because it allowed the existence of longitudinal waves. Based on work on Maxwell's equations, Heaviside pronounced that longitudinal waves could not exist in a vacuum or a homogeneous medium. Heaviside did not note, however, that longitudinal electromagnetic waves can exist at a boundary or in an enclosed space.

== Philosophy ==
Helmholtz's scientific work in physiology and mechanics occasioned much that he is known for in philosophy of science, including ideas on the relation between the laws of perception and the laws of nature and his rejection of the exclusive use of Euclidean geometry.

His philosophy of science wavered between some version of empiricism and transcendental idealism. Despite the speculative associations of the latter, his philosophy of science is thoroughly indebted to his use of mathematical physics to supplant vitalism and articulate the general conservation of energy principle.

His rejection of Euclidean geometry as the only possible science of space is central to understanding his appropriation of Kant's philosophy of space, which ostensibly requires Euclidean geometry to be that exclusive a priori science of physical space. Helmholtz introduced a new conception of the a priori in space: that of the determination of the manifold of possible orientations in perceptual space. These developments inspired new readings of Kant and contributed to the rise of late modern neo-Kantianism movement in philosophy.

== Students and associates ==
Other students and research associates of Helmholtz at Berlin included Max Planck, Heinrich Kayser, Eugen Goldstein, Wilhelm Wien, Arthur König, Henry Augustus Rowland, Albert A. Michelson, Wilhelm Wundt, Fernando Sanford, Arthur Gordon Webster and Michael I. Pupin. Leo Koenigsberger, who was his colleague from 1869 to 1871 in Heidelberg, wrote the definitive biography of him in 1902.

== Honours and legacy ==
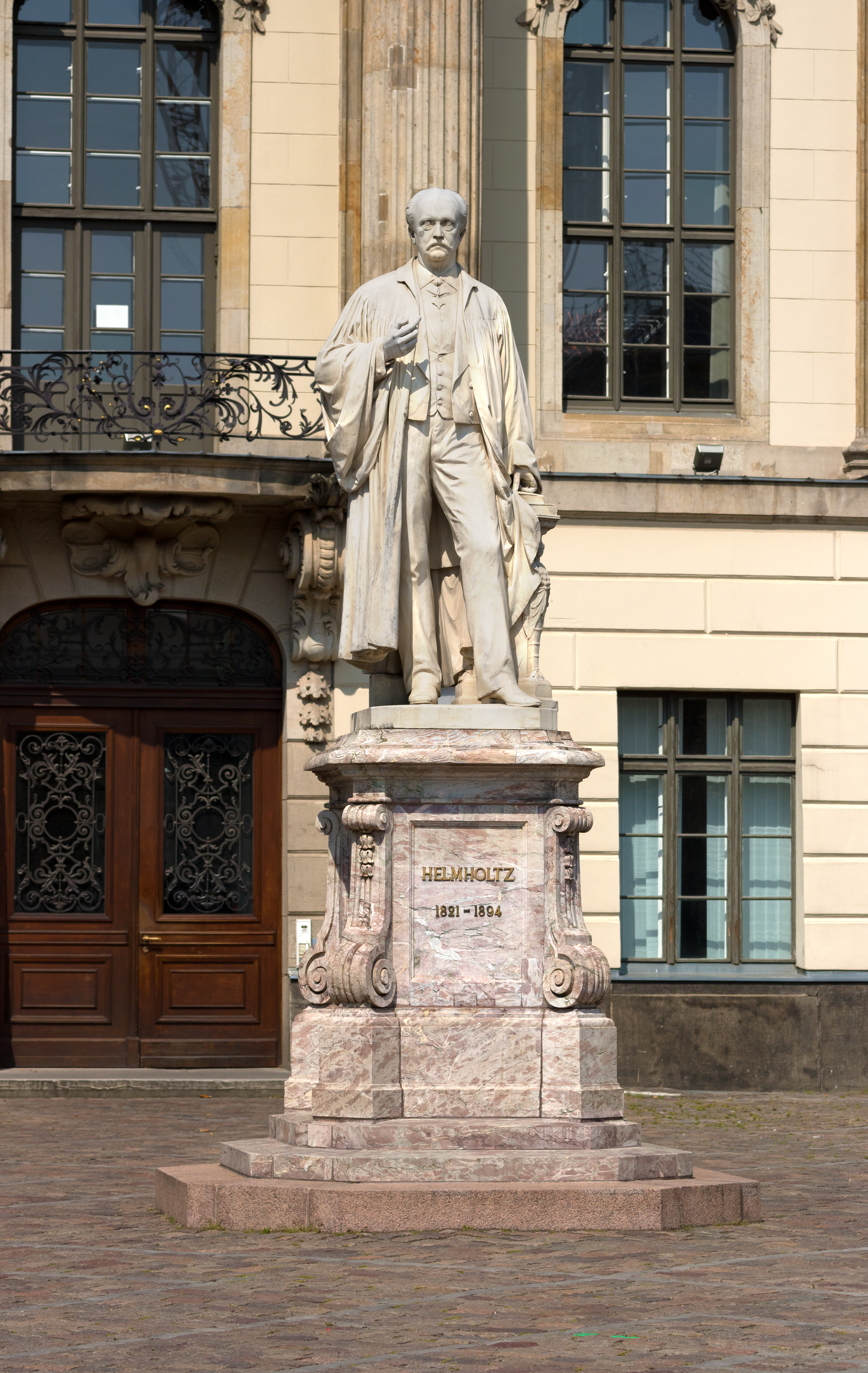
Helmholtz's statue in front of Humboldt University in Berlin

- In 1873, Helmholtz was elected as a member of the American Philosophical Society.
- In 1881, Helmholtz was elected Honorary Fellow of the Royal College of Surgeons in Ireland.
- On 10 November 1881, he was awarded the Légion d'honneur: au grade de Commandeur, or Level 3 – a senior grade. (No. 2173).
- In 1883, Professor Helmholtz was honoured by the Emperor, being raised to the nobility, or Adel. The Adelung meant that he and his family were now styled: von Helmholtz. The distinction was not a peerage or title, but it was hereditary and conferred a certain social cachet.
- Helmholtz was conferred the Honorary Membership of the Institution of Engineers and Shipbuilders in Scotland in 1884.
- He was elected to honorary membership of the Manchester Literary and Philosophical Society on 9 February 1886,
- The largest German association of research institutions, the Helmholtz Association, is named after him.
- The asteroid 11573 Helmholtz and the lunar crater Helmholtz as well as the crater Helmholtz on Mars were named in his honour.
- In Charlottenburg, Berlin, the street Helmholtzstraße is named after von Helmholtz.
- In Prenzlauer Berg, Berlin, the plaza Helmholtzplatz and the surrounding neighborhood, Helmholtzkiez, are named after von Helmholtz.
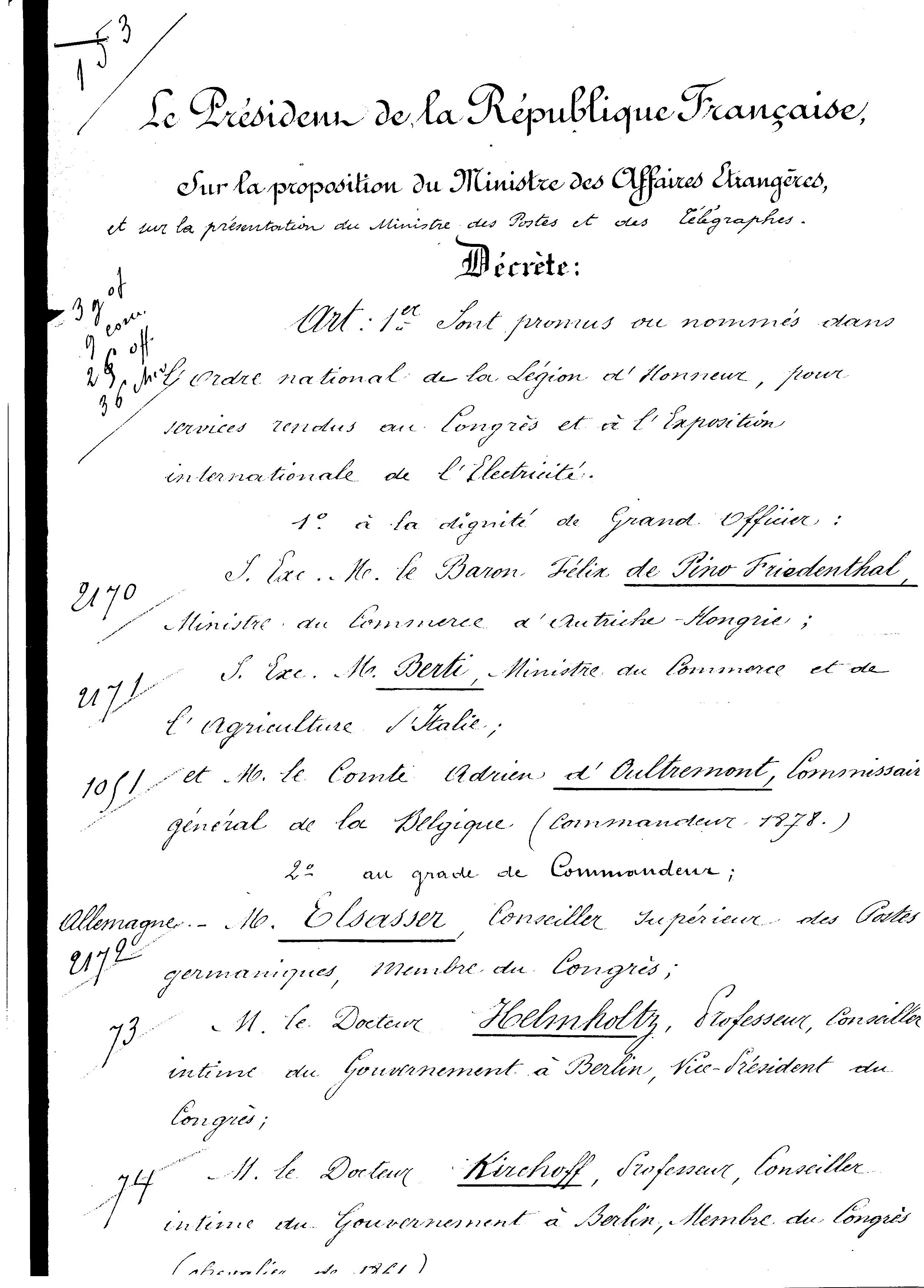
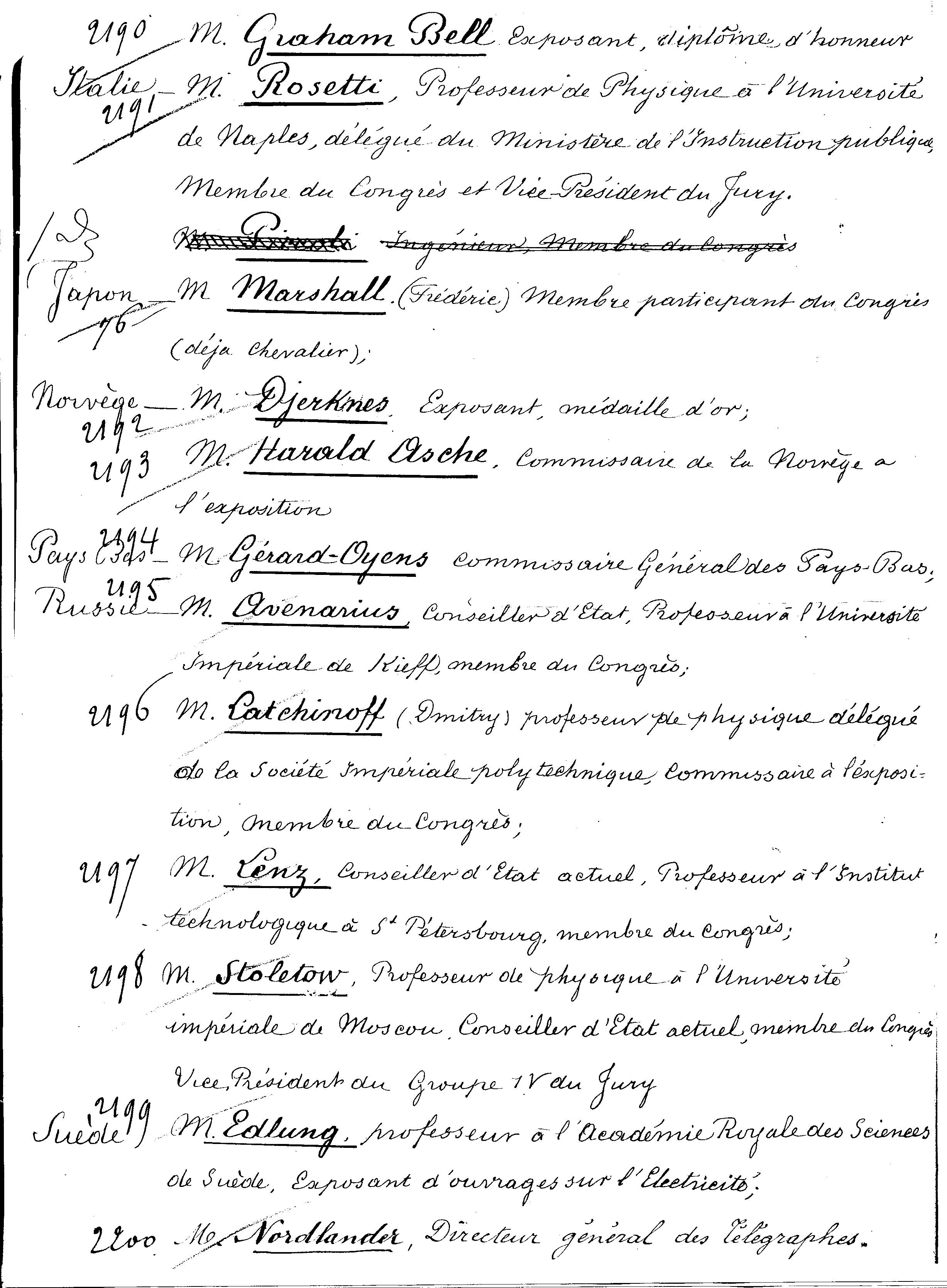
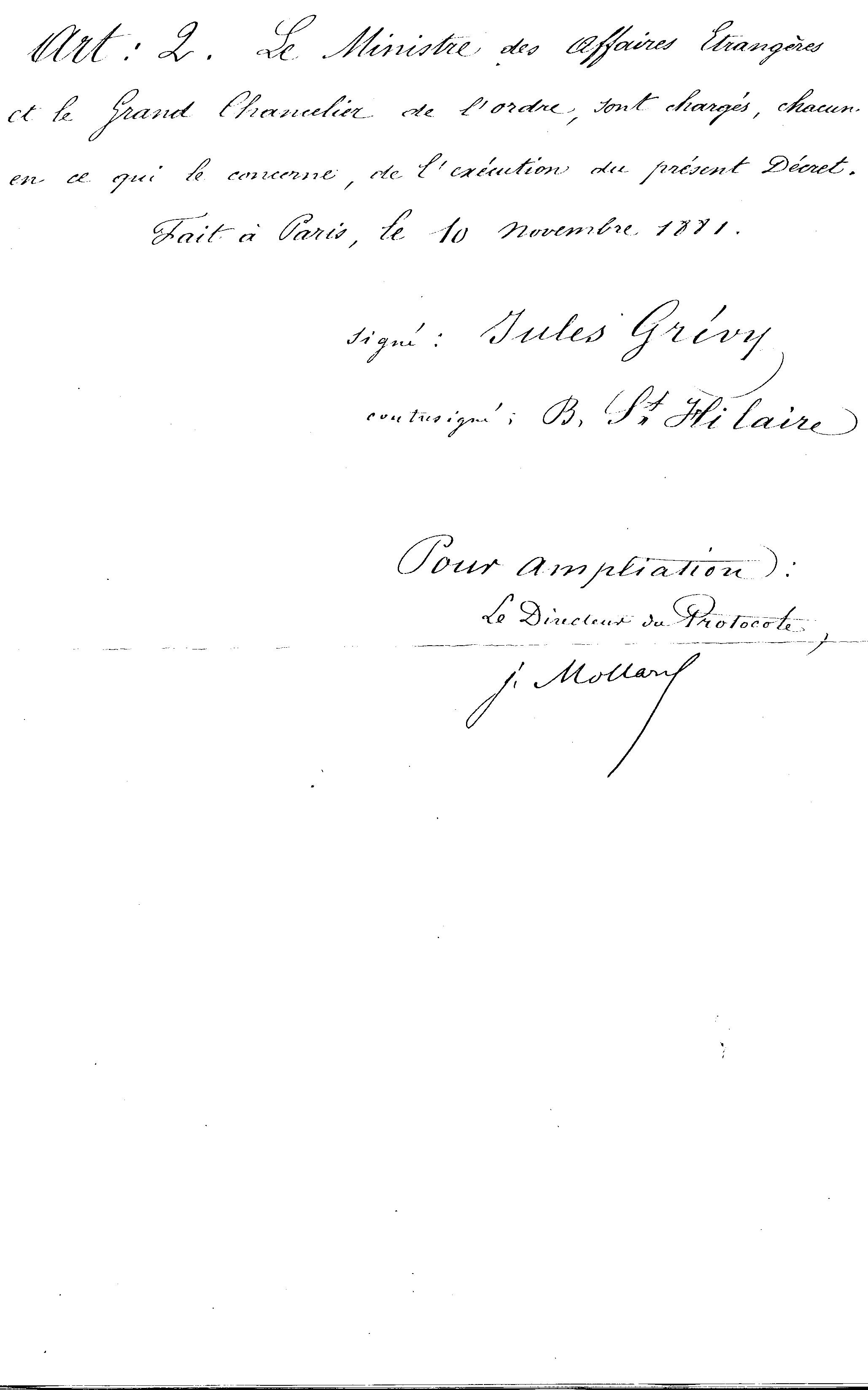
Decree awarding Helmholtz (listed in first page) the French Legion of Honour

== Works ==
- Über die Erhaltung der Kraft (in German). Leipzig: Wilhelm Engelmann. 1889.
- Vorlesungen über die elektromagnetische Theorie des Lichts (in German). Leipzig: Johann Ambrosius Barth. 1897.
- Vorlesungen über die mathematischen Principien der Akustik (in German). Leipzig: Johann Ambrosius Barth. 1898.
- Vorlesungen über die Dynamik discreter Massenpunkte (in German). Leipzig: Johann Ambrosius Barth. 1898.
- Dynamik continuirlich verbreiteter Massen (in German). Leipzig: Johann Ambrosius Barth. 1902.
- Vorlesungen über die Theorie der Wärme (in German). Leipzig: Johann Ambrosius Barth. 1903.
- Vorlesungen über Theoretische Physik (in German). Leipzig: Johann Ambrosius Barth. 1903.

=== Translated works ===
- On the Conservation of Force (1847) HathiTrust
- Lehre von den Tonempfindungen als physiologische Grundlage für die Theorie der Musik (in French). Paris: Masson. 1874.
- Helmholtz, Herman (1876). "On the Limits of the Optical Capacity of the Microscope". Monthly Microscopical Journal. 16: 15–39. doi:10.1111/j.1365-2818.1876.tb05606.x.
- Populäre wissenschaftliche Vorträge. New York: Appleton. 1885.
- On the Conservation of Force (1895) Introduction to a Series of Lectures Delivered at Carlsruhe in the Winter of 1862–1863, English translation
- On the Sensations of Tone as a Physiological Basis for the Theory of Music (downloadable from California Digital Library) Third Edition of English Translation, based on Fourth German Edition of 1877, By Hermann von Helmholtz, Alexander John Ellis, Published by Longmans, Green, 1895, 576 pages
- On the Sensations of Tone as a Physiological Basis for the Theory of Music (downloadable from Google Books) Fourth Edition, By Hermann von Helmholtz, Alexander John Ellis, Published by Longmans, Green, 1912, 575 pages
- Treatise on Physiological Optics (1910) three volumes. English translation by Optical Society of America (1924–25).
- Popular lectures on scientific subjects (1885)
- Popular lectures on scientific subjects second series (1908)

== See also ==
- Helmholtz coil
- List of people from Berlin
- List of things named after Hermann von Helmholtz
- Neo-Kantianism
- Theory of Colours
