= Palm Heinrich Ludwig von Boguslawski =

German astronomer (1789–1851)

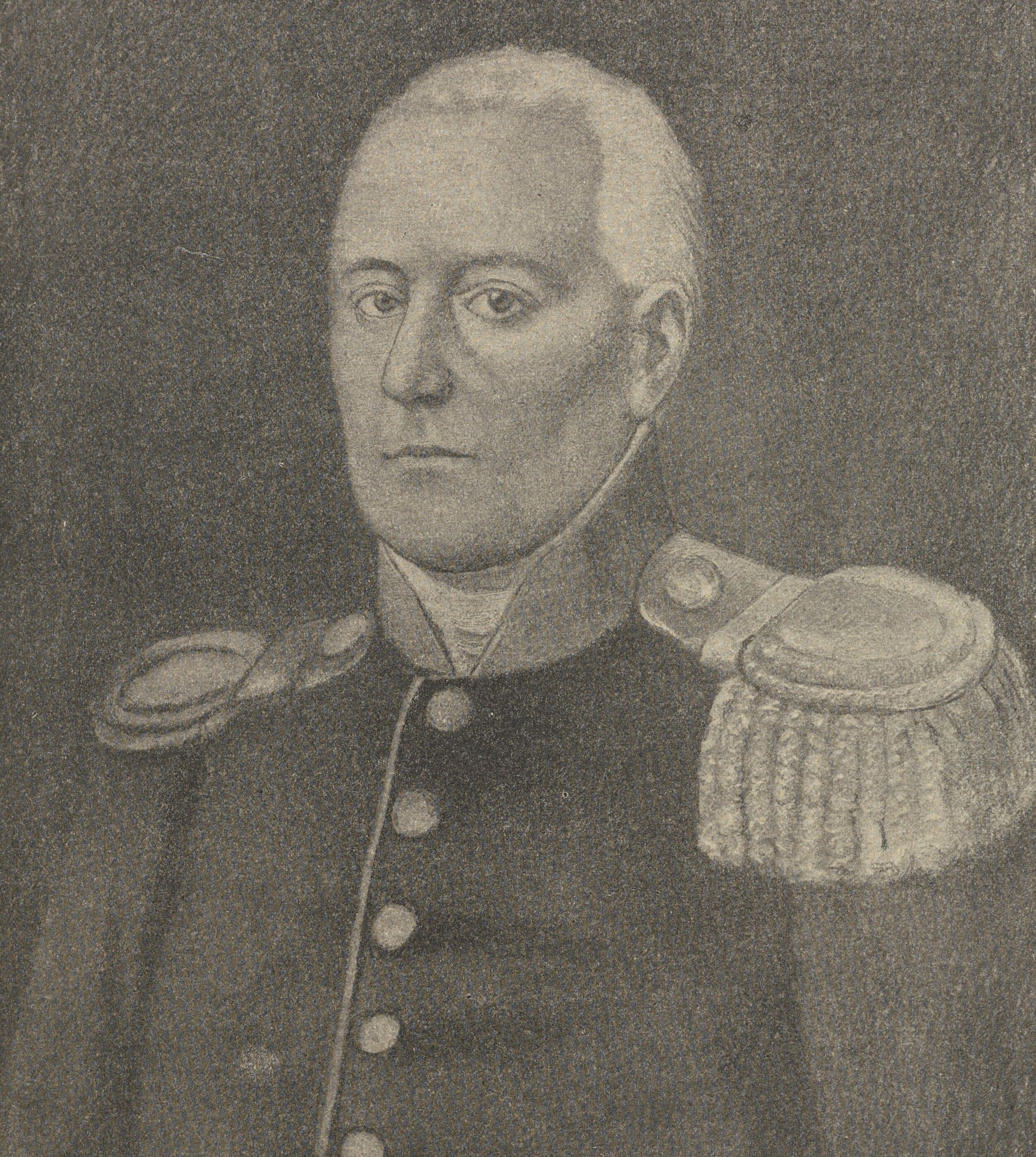
Later depiction

Palm (or Palon) Heinrich Ludwig (Pruß) von Boguslawski (7 September 1789 – 5 June 1851) was a German astronomy professor and observatory director in Breslau (Wrocław).

== Early life ==
A native of Magdeburg, Boguslawski met Johann Elert Bode (1747–1826), who was an observatory director in Berlin and published the celestial atlas Uranographia, at the Prussian Military Academy in Berlin between 1811 and 1812, when Boguslawski did his military service.

== Military service ==
Boguslawski was an artillery officer in the Prussian Army during the 1812 French invasion of Russia led by Napoleon. He retired as Hauptmann.

== Astronomy ==
After the war, he took up residence on his family's lands outside Breslau. In 1831 he became curator at the observatory in Breslau, and was appointed in 1836 to an honorary professorship at the University of Breslau.

In the night from 20 April to 21 April 1835, Boguslawski detected a comet, estimated its course, and reported it to Herr Geheimer Ober-Regierungs-Rath. For this, the comet (also known as 1835 I) was named after him.

He also did valuable observations and calculations of Biela's, Encke's and Halley's Comets, published contributions in astronomy magazines and participated in the publication of the magazine Uranus from 1842 to his death in 1851.

At the university, the mechanics Ernst Carl Gottfried Wilhelm (1794–1843) and Ernst Karl Gustav Theodor Pinzger (1819–1882) supported him. They also were active for the "Schlesische Gesellschaft für vaterländische Kultur".

== Honours ==
Boguslawski has the comet he discovered named after him, as well as a lunar crater. Further, he received the first gold comet medal for his work in identifying Comet Boguslawksi. He was awarded the Lalande Prize in 1835.
