= Luna 25 =

Failed Russian lunar lander

Luna-25
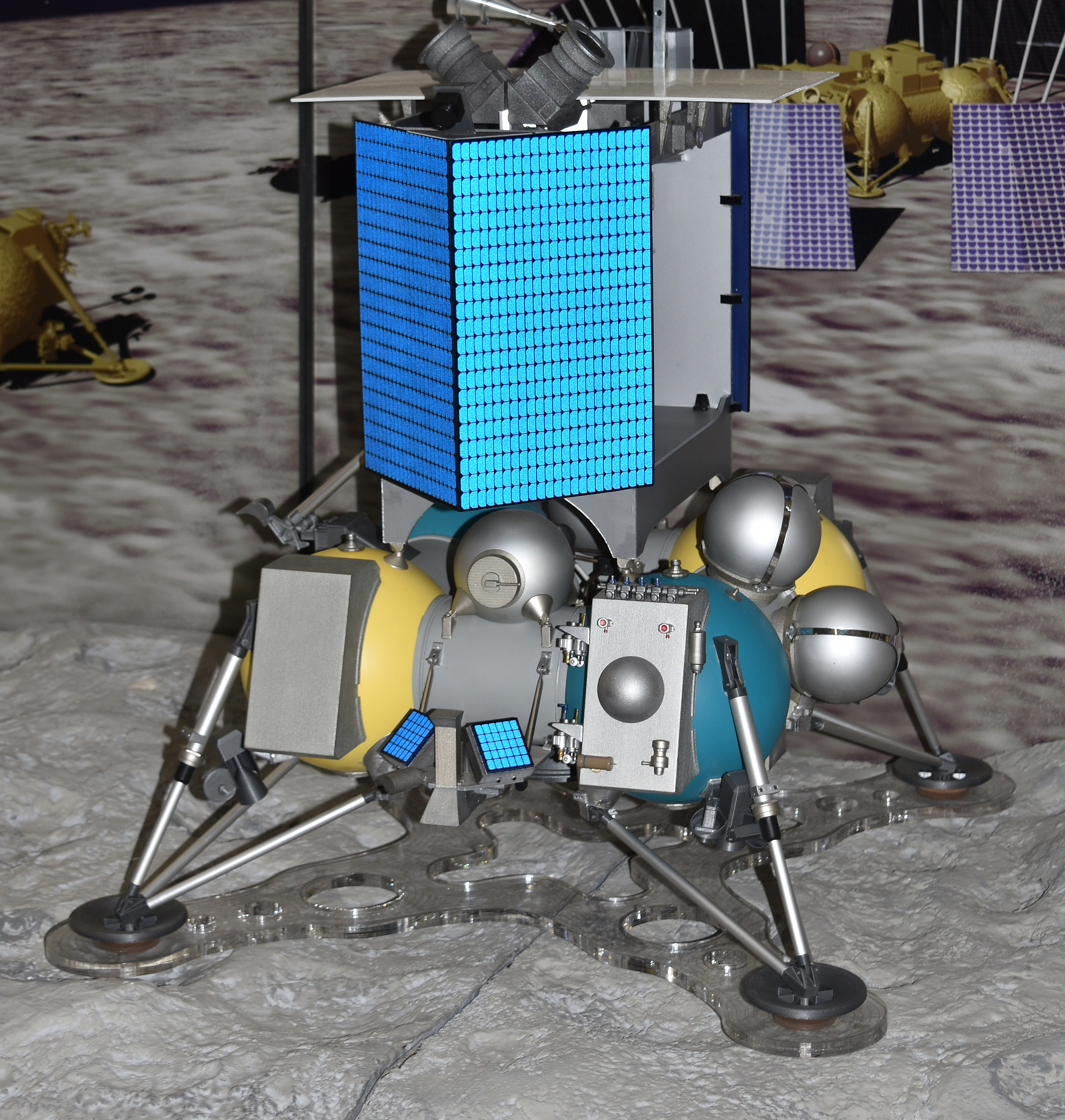
- Luna 25 lunar lander mock-up
- Names: Luna-Glob lander
- Mission type: Technology, reconnaissance
- Operator: SRI RAS (IKI RAN)
- COSPAR ID: 2023-118A
- SATCAT no.: 57600
- Website: iki.cosmos.ru/missions/luna-25
- Mission duration: 1 year (planned); Actual: c. 9 days (mission failure)

Spacecraft properties
- Spacecraft type: Robotic lander
- Manufacturer: NPO Lavochkin
- Launch mass: 1,750 kg (3,860 lb)
- Payload mass: 30 kg (66 lb)

Start of mission
- Launch date: August 10, 2023, 23:10 UTC
- Rocket: Soyuz-2.1b / Fregat
- Launch site: Vostochny Cosmodrome
- Contractor

Lunar lander
- Landing date: 11:57, 19 August 2023 (UTC) (crashed)
- Landing site: near-Lunar south pole (intended); 57.865°S 61.360°E (crash site) (Pontécoulant G crater)
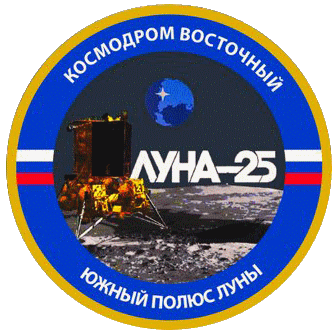
- Luna 25 mission patch Luna-Glob programme

Luna 25 (Russian: Луна-25), also known as the Luna-Glob lander, was a failed Russian lunar lander mission operated by Roscosmos. It was the first lunar mission undertaken by Russia since the Soviet-era Luna 24 in 1976, and was intended to be the first spacecraft ever to land near the lunar south pole. The spacecraft was manufactured by NPO Lavochkin and carried 30 kg (66 lb) of scientific instruments, including instruments for analyzing lunar regolith and measuring plasma in the exosphere.

Luna 25 lifted off on 10 August 2023, at 23:10 UTC, atop a Soyuz-2.1b rocket with a Fregat upper stage from the Vostochny Cosmodrome in Russia's Amur Region. The spacecraft entered lunar orbit on 16 August 2023, with a scheduled landing date of 21 August near the crater Boguslawsky. On 19 August 2023, a failed orbital maneuver caused the lander to follow a trajectory that intersected with the lunar surface rather than the planned elliptical orbit. The spacecraft crashed into the inner rim of Pontécoulant G crater at 11:57 UTC, approximately 400 kilometers short of its intended landing site. The impact site was later identified by NASA's Lunar Reconnaissance Orbiter.

Originally named the Luna-Glob lander, the mission was renamed Luna 25 to emphasize continuity with the Soviet Union's historic Luna programme, though it remained part of the modern Luna-Glob lunar exploration program. At least 12.5 billion rubles (over US$130 million) had been spent on the project prior to its failure.

== History ==
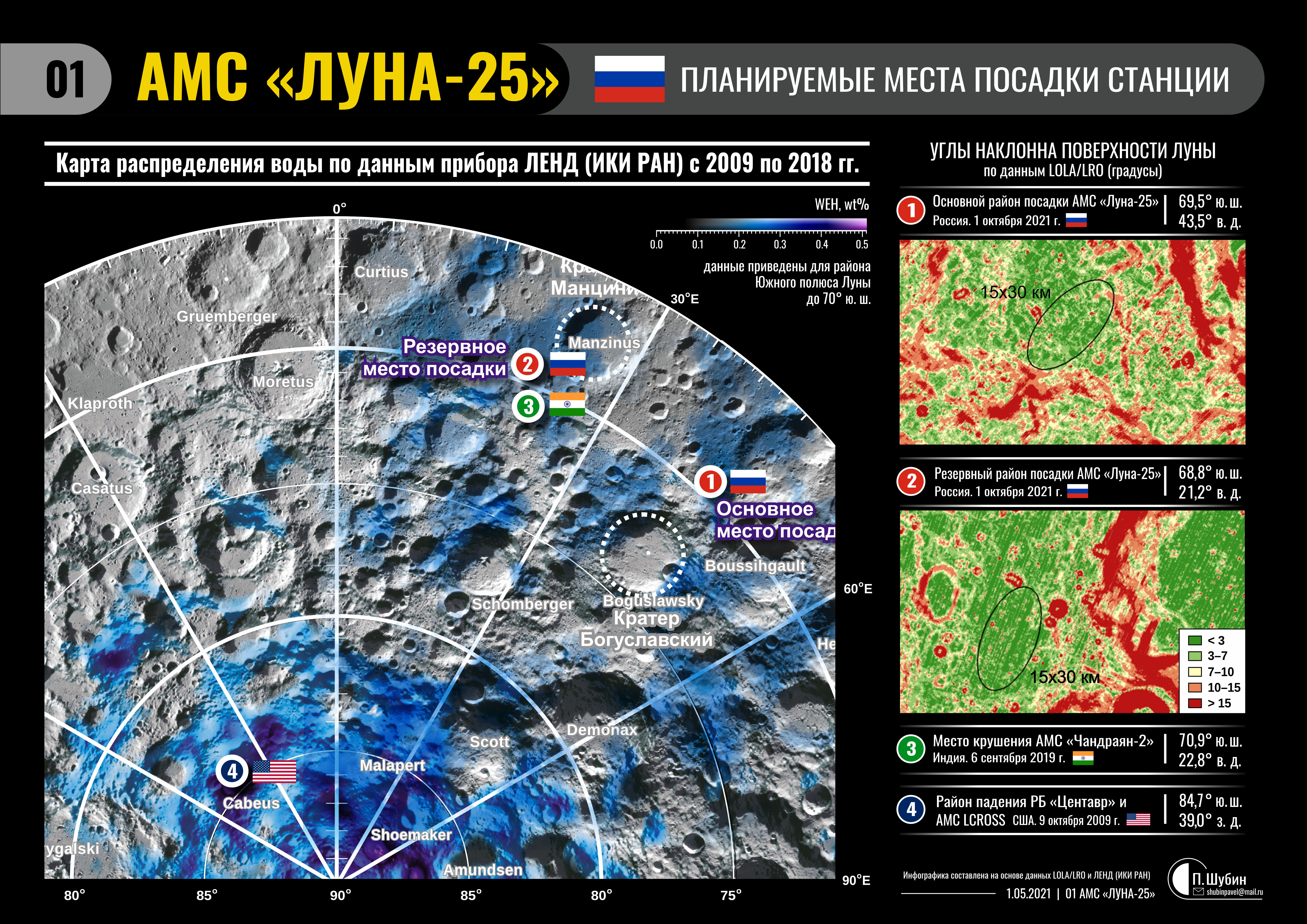
Proposed landing sites

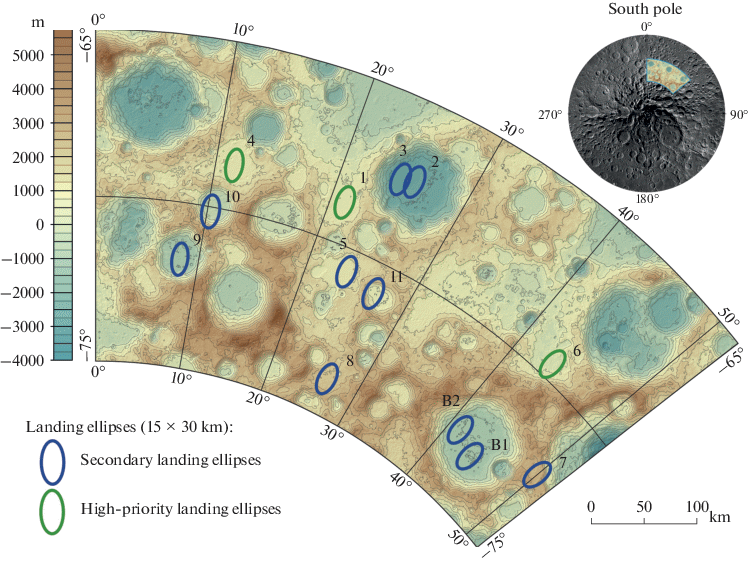
Suggested landing ellipses for Luna-Glob (Luna-25). Primary ellipses are 1, 4, 6 and secondary ellipses are 2, 3, 5, 7, 8, 9, 10, 11 and B1, B2.

The previous lunar lander in the series was a Soviet craft, Luna 24, launched in 1976. Nascent plans for what became Luna 25 began in the late 1990s, with the evaluation of two spacecraft designs having taken place by 1998. Attempts to revive and complete the project continued throughout the 2000s and were punctuated by an aborted attempt at international cooperation via a merger with JAXA's now-cancelled Lunar-A orbiter, and pressure from another attempted cooperative lunar mission with Indian Space Research Organisation (ISRO) (which continued without Russia's involvement).

Initial mission plans called for a lander and orbiter, with the latter also deploying impact penetrators. In its final form, Luna 25 was a lander only, with a primary mission of testing the landing technology. The mission carried 30 kg (66 lb) of scientific instruments, including a robotic arm for soil samples and possible drilling hardware.

Delays in the 2010s came first from the significant rework and delay brought on by the failure of Phobos-Grunt in 2011. At this point the modern Luna 25 design was developed. Later work on the lander was slowed by resource pressures being placed upon spacecraft developer NPO Lavochkin, such as the weather satellite Elektro-L No.2 and the Spektr-RG observatory, as well the landing platform Russia was contributing to ExoMars 2020.

By 2017, the propulsion system for the spacecraft was in assembly.

The intended landing site was located at 69.545°S 43.544°E (north of the crater Boguslawsky), with two backup locations at 68.773°S 21.210°E (southwest of the Manzini crater) and 68.648°S 11.553°E (south of Pentland A crater).

The planned mission duration of the lander on the surface of the Moon was to be at least one Earth year.

At least 12.5 billion roubles (over US$130 million) had been spent on the project.

== Science payload ==
The lander featured a 30 kg (66 lb) payload comprising eight Russian science instruments:

- ADRON-LR, active neutron and gamma-ray analysis of regolith
- ARIES-L, measurement of plasma in the exosphere
- LASMA-LR, laser mass-spectrometer
- LIS-TV-RPM, infrared spectrometry of minerals and imaging
- PmL, measurement of dust and micro-meteorites
- THERMO-L, measurement of the thermal properties of regolith
- STS-L, panoramic and local imaging
- Laser retroreflector, Moon libration and ranging experiments

LINA-XSAN, a Swedish payload, was originally to fly with Luna 25, but delays to the launch date caused Sweden to cancel this plan. Instead, LINA-XSAN flew on Chang'e 4 in 2019.

ESA's PILOT-D navigation demonstration camera was planned to be flown on this mission, but flew instead with a commercial service provider, due to continued international collaboration having been thrown into doubt by the 2022 Russian invasion of Ukraine and related sanctions on Russia. The demonstration instrument was supposed to collect data for the landing of other missions and was therefore not part of the lander's operating system.

== Flight ==
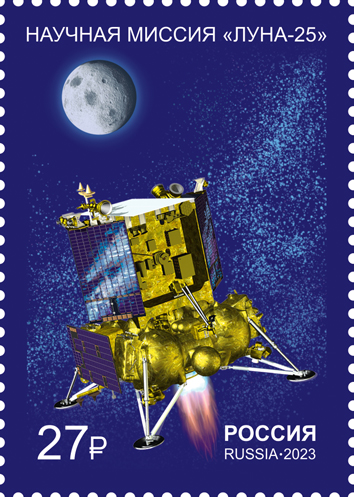
Commemorative Luna 25 Stamp

External video
- Luna-25 launch

The launch took place on 10 August 2023 from Vostochny Cosmodrome on a Soyuz-2 rocket with a Fregat upper stage. On 16 August, the lander entered lunar orbit, with a scheduled landing date of 21 August.

=== Crash ===
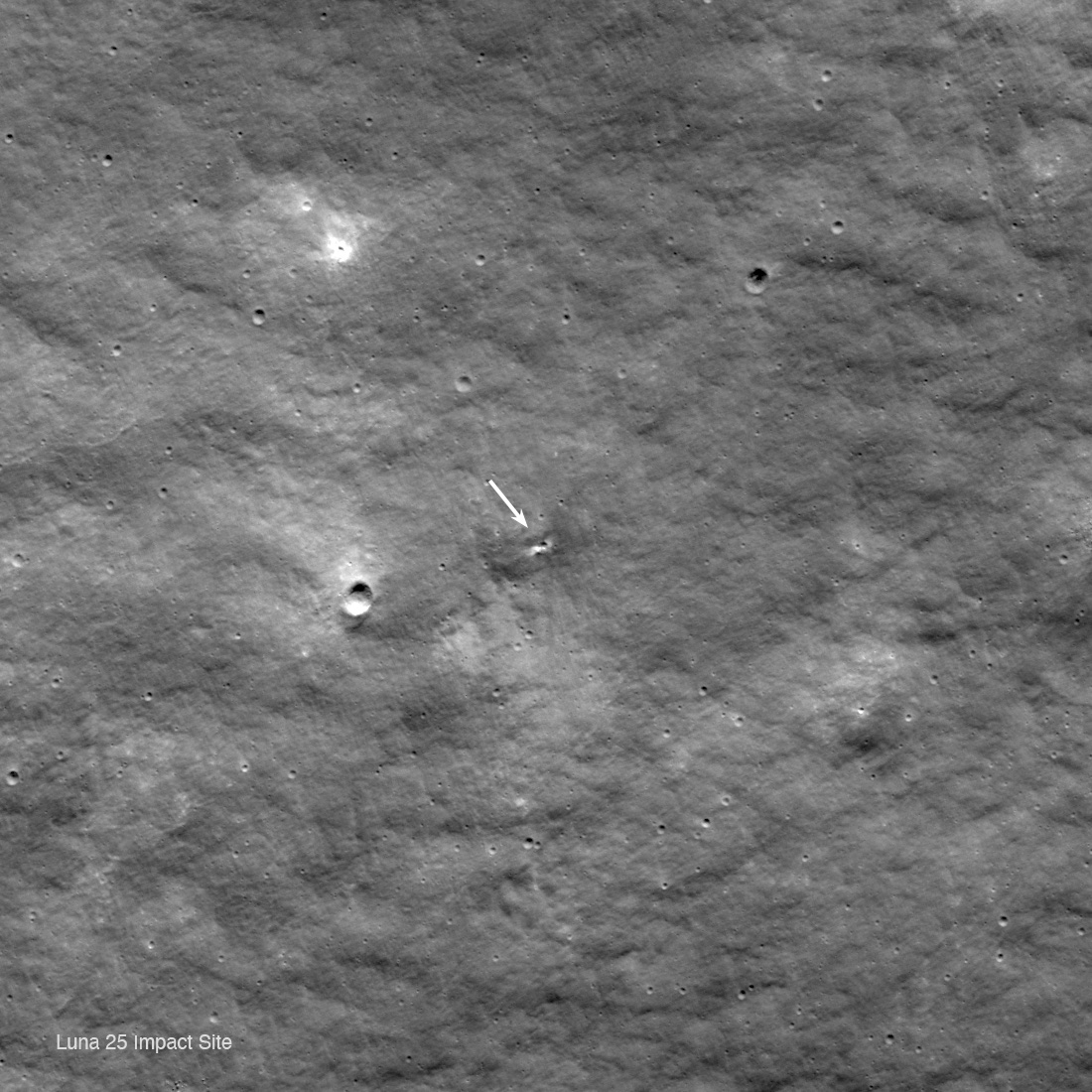
Luna 25 impact site (arrowed), photographed by NASA's Lunar Reconnaissance Orbiter on 26 August 2023. The field of view is 1,100 meters wide, with lunar north at the top.

On 19 August, Roscosmos declared an "abnormal situation" after commanding the lander to move into a pre-landing orbit. According to Director General of Roscosmos Yuri Borisov, a maneuvering engine could not be shut down, and ran for 127 seconds instead of 84. The lander crashed on the lunar surface following the failed maneuver, which created a trajectory that intersected with the Moon instead of a planned elliptical orbit with a minimum distance of 18 km.

Roscosmos said that it had lost contact with the spacecraft 47 minutes after the start of the engine firing. Attempts on 19 and 20 August to locate and re-establish contact with the spacecraft were unsuccessful, and a commission was formed to investigate the crash.

The LRO camera team located the likely location of the impact crater, after an estimate was published by Russian researchers. The crash site is situated on the steep inner rim of the Pontécoulant G crater, which is 400 kilometers short of Luna 25's intended landing point if it had attempted a landing procedure.

== See also ==
- Chandrayaan-3
- SLIM
- Chang'e 6
- Lunar water
- List of missions to the Moon
