= Hanno (crater) =

Crater on the Moon

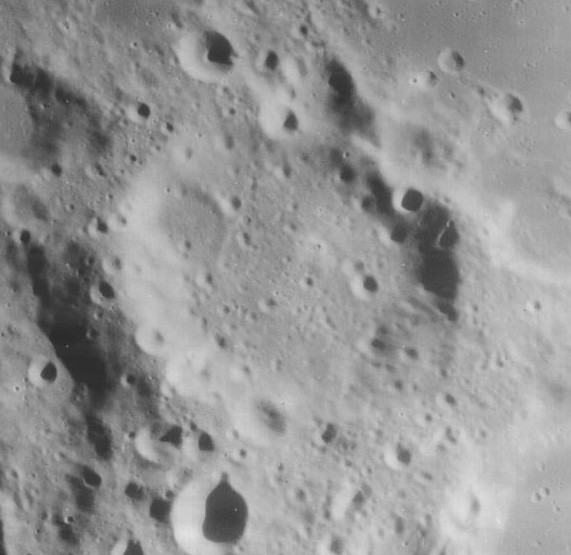
- Lunar Orbiter 4 image
- Coordinates: 56.3°S 71.2°E
- Diameter: 56 km
- Depth: Unknown
- Colongitude: 290° at sunrise
- Eponym: Hanno the Navigator

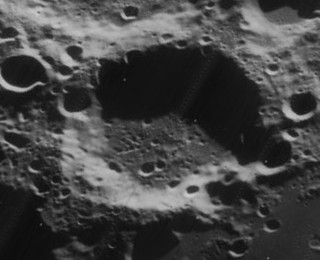
Oblique view also from Lunar Orbiter 4

Hanno is a lunar impact crater that lies near the southeastern limb of the Moon, along the western edge of the Mare Australe. About a crater diameter to the southwest is the prominent crater Pontécoulant.

Hanno is a heavily worn crater formation with an outer rim that has been battered and pock-marked by small impacts. A small crater attached to the north-northeastern rim forms a depression in the side. The inner walls are nearly featureless except for a few small craterlets, and the interior floor is likewise level and battered by tiny craters.

The Hanno crater was named after Hanno the Navigator.

== Satellite craters ==
By convention these features are identified on lunar maps by placing the letter on the side of the crater midpoint that is closest to Hanno.

Hanno	Latitude	Longitude	Diameter
A	53.4° S	63.2° E	38 km
B	52.6° S	68.6° E	36 km
C	55.9° S	68.9° E	22 km
D	59.1° S	78.3° E	18 km
E	59.3° S	73.0° E	18 km
F	52.3° S	68.2° E	9 km
G	58.0° S	70.6° E	16 km
H	57.6° S	74.4° E	57 km
K	53.5° S	76.9° E	25 km
W	54.6° S	60.1° E	10 km
X	55.3° S	67.7° E	13 km
Y	55.3° S	66.0° E	8 km
Z	55.1° S	65.1° E	10 km
