= Pontécoulant (crater) =

Lunar impact crater

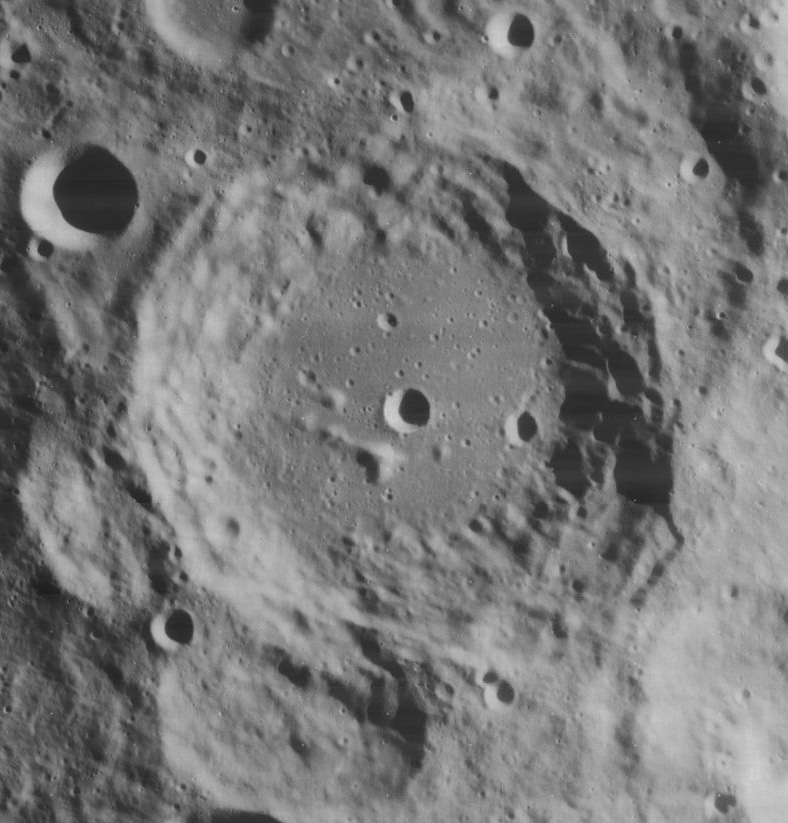
- Lunar Orbiter 4 image
- Coordinates: 58.7°S 66.0°E
- Diameter: 91 km
- Depth: 1.8 km
- Colongitude: 297° at sunrise
- Formation: Nectarian
- Eponym: Philippe G. Doulcet

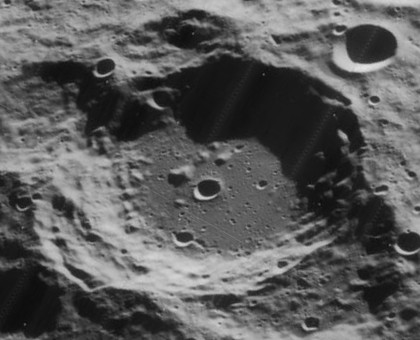
Oblique view also from Lunar Orbiter 4

Pontécoulant is a prominent lunar impact crater that is located in the southeastern part of the Moon. Due to its position, the crater appears foreshortened from the Earth and it is difficult to observe much detail. Nearby craters include Hanno just to the northeast, and the comparably sized Helmholtz due south.

This crater has terraced inner wall that is nearly circular, but with an outward extension to the southeast. The rim is somewhat worn but retains much detail. The crater partly overlies the older and smaller Pontécoulant E along the southern rim, and has several tiny craterlets on the eastern inner wall and one to the southwest.

The inner floor is nearly flat, with some rough ground near the southern rim and some low central peaks located southwest of the midpoint. There is a small but prominent crater located at the center of the floor, and several other tiny craters scattered across the inner surface.

Pontécoulant is a crater of Nectarian age.

The eponym of this crater is Philippe Gustave Doulcet, le Comte de Pontécoulant, and the name was approved by the IAU in 1935.

On 19 August 2023 the Russian Luna 25 lander crashed on the inner rim of the Pontécoulant G satellite crater, following a technical issue that prevented it from performing a soft landing in the target destination close to the Lunar south pole.

On September 3, 2023 the impact site of the Luna 25 lander has been described as a pock. An official title to this impact site has not yet been assigned by the International Astronomical Union.

== Satellite craters ==
By convention these features are identified on lunar maps by placing the letter on the side of the crater midpoint that is closest to Pontécoulant.

Pontécoulant	Latitude	Longitude	Diameter (km)
A	57.7° S	62.9° E	19
B	57.9° S	58.5° E	39
C	55.6° S	59.1° E	30
D	60.2° S	71.9° E	10
E	60.5° S	64.5° E	44
F	57.4° S	67.7° E	60
G	57.2° S	60.1° E	36
H	58.4° S	65.2° E	9
J	61.6° S	64.3° E	39
K	61.5° S	61.0° E	13
L	59.0° S	59.7° E	17
M	60.8° S	74.1° E	10
