= Boussingault (crater) =

Lunar surface depression

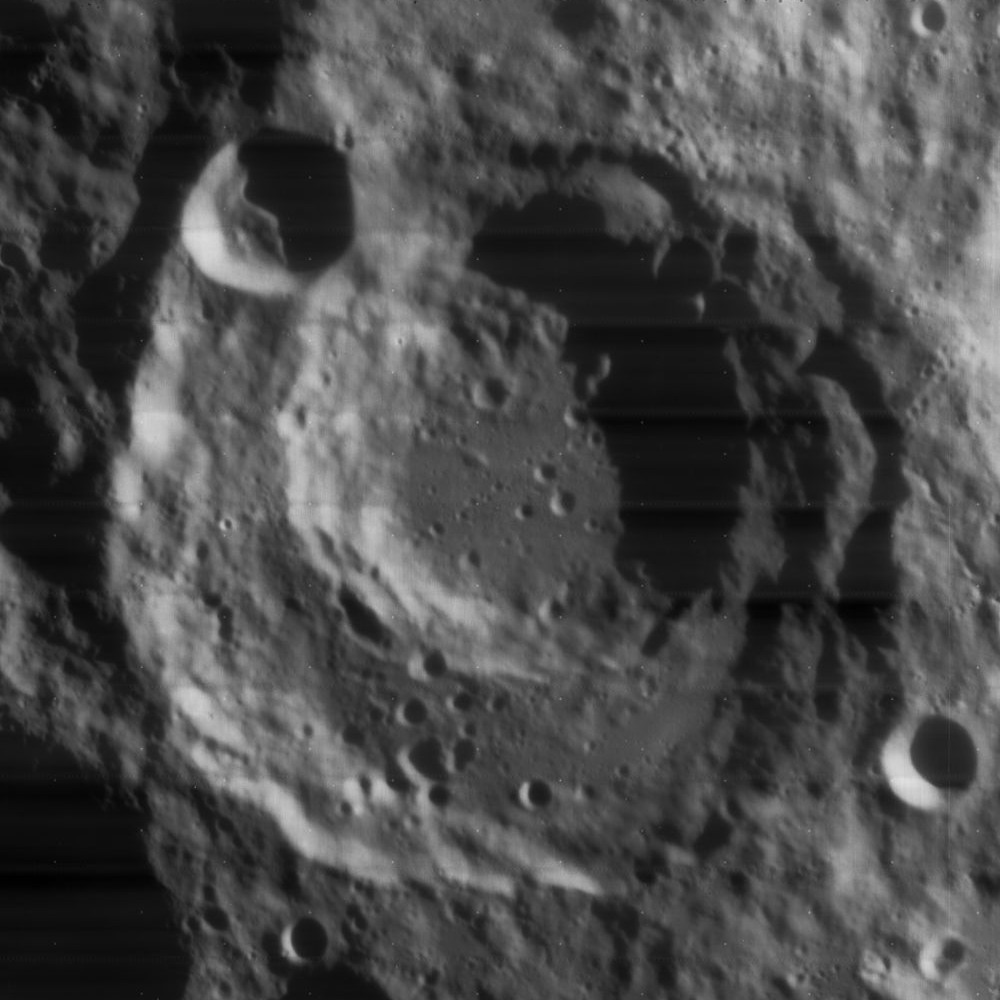
- Lunar Orbiter 4 image
- Coordinates: 70.4°S 54.7°E
- Diameter: 127.61 km (79.29 mi)
- Depth: 3.2 km (2.0 mi)
- Colongitude: 306° at sunrise
- Formation: Pre-Nectarian
- Eponym: Jean B. Boussingault

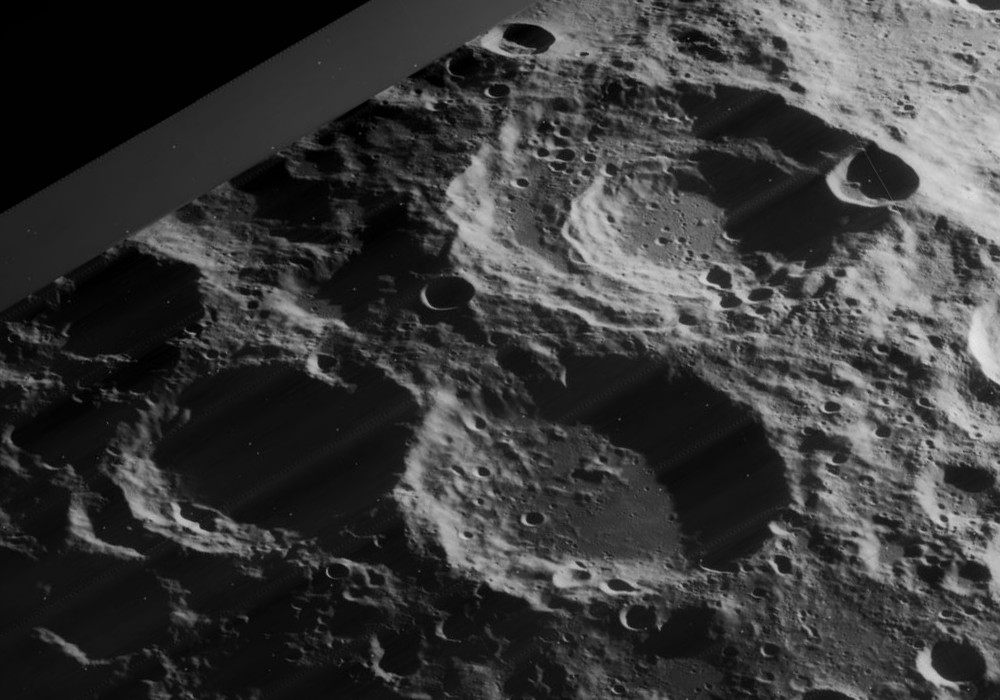
Oblique view of craters Boussingault (above right), Helmholtz (below right), and Neumayer (below left, mostly in shadow), facing southwest, from Lunar Orbiter 4

Boussingault is a large lunar impact crater that lies near the rugged southeast limb of the Moon. Because of its location, Boussingault appears highly oblong in shape due to foreshortening. To the southwest is the crater Boguslawsky, and almost attached to the northeast rim is Helmholtz. East-southeast of Boussingault lies the crater Neumayer.

On the lunar geologic timescale, this formation dates to the Pre-Nectarian period. The most notable aspect of this crater is the large crater that lies entirely within its outer walls, Boussingault A, so that it resembles a double-walled formation. Only the southern floor of Boussingault remains, and that is pitted by multiple small craterlets. The outer rim is worn and Boussingault K lies across the northwest rim. Further to the northwest is the overlapping triple crater formation of Boussingault E, B, and C.

This crater is named after French chemist Jean B. Boussingault (1802-1887). His name was introduced into lunar nomenclature by German astronomer J. H. von Mädler during the 19th century. Its designation was formally adopted by the International Astronomical Union in 1935.

== Satellite craters ==
By convention these features are identified on lunar maps by placing the letter on the side of the crater midpoint that is closest to Boussingault.

Boussingault	Latitude	Longitude	Diameter
A	69.9° S	54.0° E	72 km
B	65.5° S	46.9° E	54 km
C	65.1° S	48.2° E	24 km
D	63.5° S	44.9° E	9 km
E	67.2° S	46.8° E	98 km
F	68.8° S	39.4° E	16 km
G	71.4° S	51.8° E	5 km
K	68.9° S	50.9° E	29 km
N	71.5° S	62.1° E	15 km
P	67.1° S	45.1° E	13 km
R	64.3° S	48.6° E	12 km
S	64.1° S	46.9° E	16 km
T	63.0° S	43.2° E	20 km
