= Inverse problem for Lagrangian mechanics =

In mathematics, the inverse problem for Lagrangian mechanics is the problem of determining whether a given system of ordinary differential equations can arise as the Euler–Lagrange equations for some Lagrangian function.

There has been a great deal of activity in the study of this problem since the early 20th century. A notable advance in this field was a 1941 paper by the American mathematician Jesse Douglas, in which he provided necessary and sufficient conditions for the problem to have a solution; these conditions are now known as the Helmholtz conditions, after the German physicist Hermann von Helmholtz.

== Background and statement of the problem ==
Consider a differentiable path $u:[0,T]\to\R^n$. The action of the path $u$, denoted $S(u)$, is given by

$$S(u) = \int_{0}^{T} L(t, u(t), \dot{u}(t)) \, \mathrm{d} t,$$

where $L$ is a function of time, position and velocity known as the Lagrangian. The principle of least action states that, given an initial state $x_0$ and a final state $x_1$ in $\R^n$, the trajectory that the system determined by $L$ will actually follow must be a minimizer of the action functional $S$ satisfying the boundary conditions $u(0)=x_0$ and $u(T)=x_1$. Furthermore, the critical points (and hence minimizers) of $S$ must satisfy the Euler–Lagrange equations for $S$:

$$\frac{\mathrm{d}}{\mathrm{d} t} \frac{\partial L}{\partial \dot{u}^{i}} - \frac{\partial L}{\partial u^{i}} = 0$$

for $1\leq i\leq n$, where the upper indices $i$ denote the components of $u=(u^1,\dots,u^n)$. In the classical case where

$$T(\dot{u}) = \frac{1}{2} m | \dot{u} |^{2},\quad\; V : [0, T] \times \mathbb{R}^{n} \to \mathbb{R},\quad\; L(t, u, \dot{u}) = T(\dot{u}) - V(t, u),$$

the Euler–Lagrange equations are the second-order ordinary differential equations better known as Newton's laws of motion:

$$m \ddot{u}^{i} = - \frac{\partial V(t, u)}{\partial u^{i}}$$

for $1\leq i\leq n$, i.e. $m \ddot{u} = - \nabla_{u} V(t, u)$.

The inverse problem of Lagrangian mechanics is as follows: given a system of second-order ordinary differential equations

$$\ddot{u}^{i} = f^{i} (u^{j}, \dot{u}^{j}) \quad \mbox{(E)}$$

for $1\leq i,j\leq n$ that holds for times $0\leq t\leq T$, does there exist a Lagrangian $L:[0,T]\times\R^n\times\R^n\to\R$ for which these ordinary differential equations (E) are the Euler–Lagrange equations? In general, this problem is posed not on Euclidean space $\R^n$, but on an $n$-dimensional manifold $M$, and the Lagrangian is a function $L:[0,T]\times TM\to\R$, where $TM$ denotes the tangent bundle of $M$.

== Douglas' theorem and the Helmholtz conditions ==
To simplify the notation, let

$$v^{i} = \dot{u}^{i}$$

and define a collection of n^{2} functions Φ_{j}^{i} by

$$\Phi_{j}^{i} = \frac{1}{2} \frac{\mathrm{d}}{\mathrm{d} t} \frac{\partial f^{i}}{\partial v^{j}} - \frac{\partial f^{i}}{\partial u^{j}} - \frac{1}{4} \frac{\partial f^{i}}{\partial v^{k}} \frac{\partial f^{k}}{\partial v^{j}}.$$

Theorem. (Douglas 1941) There exists a Lagrangian L : [0, T] × TM → R such that the equations (E) are its Euler–Lagrange equations if and only if there exists a non-singular symmetric matrix g with entries g_{ij} depending on both u and v satisfying the following three Helmholtz conditions:

$$g \Phi = (g \Phi)^{\top}, \quad \mbox{(H1)}$$
$$\frac{\mathrm{d} g_{ij}}{\mathrm{d} t} + \frac{1}{2} \frac{\partial f^{k}}{\partial v^{i}} g_{kj} + \frac{1}{2} \frac{\partial f^{k}}{\partial v^{j}} g_{ki} = 0 \mbox{ for } 1 \leq i, j \leq n, \quad \mbox{(H2)}$$
$$\frac{\partial g_{ij}}{\partial v^{k}} = \frac{\partial g_{ik}}{\partial v^{j}} \mbox{ for } 1 \leq i, j, k \leq n. \quad \mbox{(H3)}$$

(The Einstein summation convention is in use for the repeated indices.)

=== Applying Douglas' theorem ===
At first glance, solving the Helmholtz equations (H1)–(H3) seems to be an extremely difficult task. Condition (H1) is the easiest to solve: it is always possible to find a g that satisfies (H1), and it alone will not imply that the Lagrangian is singular. Equation (H2) is a system of ordinary differential equations: the usual theorems on the existence and uniqueness of solutions to ordinary differential equations imply that it is, in principle, possible to solve (H2). Integration does not yield additional constants but instead first integrals of the system (E), so this step becomes difficult in practice unless (E) has enough explicit first integrals. In certain well-behaved cases (e.g. the geodesic flow for the canonical connection on a Lie group), this condition is satisfied.

The final and most difficult step is to solve equation (H3), called the closure conditions since (H3) is the condition that the differential 1-form g_{i} is a closed form for each i. The reason why this is so daunting is that (H3) constitutes a large system of coupled partial differential equations: for n degrees of freedom, (H3) constitutes a system of

$$2 \left( \begin{matrix} n + 1 \\ 3 \end{matrix} \right)$$

partial differential equations in the 2n independent variables that are the components g_{ij} of g, where

$$\left( \begin{matrix} n \\ k \end{matrix} \right)$$

denotes the binomial coefficient. In order to construct the most general possible Lagrangian, one must solve this huge system!

Fortunately, there are some auxiliary conditions that can be imposed in order to help in solving the Helmholtz conditions. First, (H1) is a purely algebraic condition on the unknown matrix g. Auxiliary algebraic conditions on g can be given as follows: define functions

Ψ_{jk}^{i}

by

$$\Psi_{jk}^{i} = \frac{1}{3} \left( \frac{\partial \Phi_{j}^{i}}{\partial v^{k}} - \frac{\partial \Phi_{k}^{i}}{\partial v^{j}} \right).$$

The auxiliary condition on g is then

$$g_{mi} \Psi_{jk}^{m} + g_{mk} \Psi_{ij}^{m} + g_{mj} \Psi_{ki}^{m} = 0 \mbox{ for } 1 \leq i, j \leq n. \quad \mbox{(A)}$$

In fact, the equations (H2) and (A) are just the first in an infinite hierarchy of similar algebraic conditions. In the case of a parallel connection (such as the canonical connection on a Lie group), the higher order conditions are always satisfied, so only (H2) and (A) are of interest. Note that (A) comprises

$$\left( \begin{matrix} n \\ 3 \end{matrix} \right)$$

conditions whereas (H1) comprises

$$\left( \begin{matrix} n \\ 2 \end{matrix} \right)$$

conditions. Thus, it is possible that (H1) and (A) together imply that the Lagrangian function is singular. As of 2006, there is no general theorem to circumvent this difficulty in arbitrary dimension, although certain special cases have been resolved.

A second avenue of attack is to see whether the system (E) admits a submersion onto a lower-dimensional system and to try to "lift" a Lagrangian for the lower-dimensional system up to the higher-dimensional one. This is not really an attempt to solve the Helmholtz conditions so much as it is an attempt to construct a Lagrangian and then show that its Euler–Lagrange equations are indeed the system (E).

Recently, methods have been developed to incorporate symmetry information directly into the inverse problem of the calculus of variations. By combining the Helmholtz conditions involved in the inverse problem with relations derived from Noether's identity, it is possible to reconstruct Lagrangians that reproduce given equations of motion while ensuring the presence of prescribed symmetries.
