= Helmholtz (lunar crater) =

Impact crater

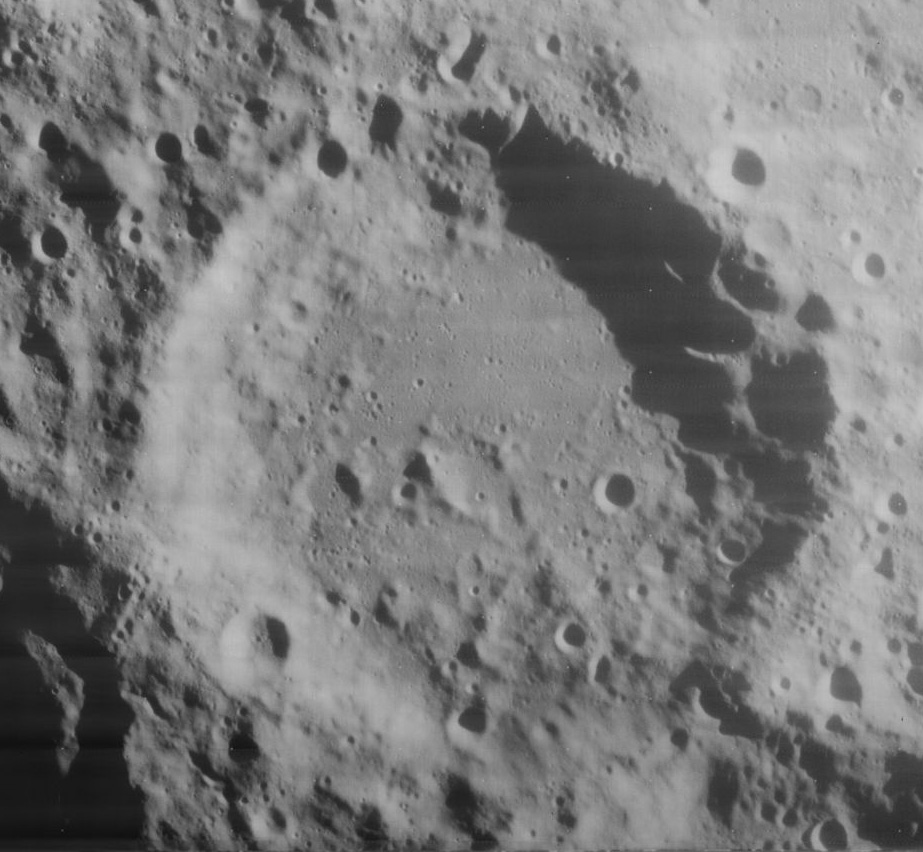
- Lunar Orbiter 4 image
- Coordinates: 68.1°S 64.1°E
- Diameter: 110.16 km (68.45 mi)
- Colongitude: 300° at sunrise
- Eponym: Hermann von Helmholtz

Helmholtz is a lunar impact crater, approximately 110 kilometers in diameter, that is located near the south-southeast limb of the Moon. Attached to the south-southeast rim of Helmholtz is the somewhat smaller crater Neumayer. The larger crater Boussingault is nearly attached to the west-southwestern rim. The crater is named after German physicist and physician Hermann von Helmholtz.

== Description ==
The outer rim of Helmholtz is worn and rounded, although not significantly disrupted. The edge of the rim can still be discerned around the perimeter, although several small craters lie along the inner edge. One such crater lies across the inner southeast wall, and a pair occupies the opposite inner wall to the northeast. There are also a couple of smaller craterlets just inside the north rim.

The northern half of the interior floor is level and marked only by a few very tiny craterlets. The southern floor is more irregular due to the overlaying ejecta from Neumayer and Boussingault, and is marked by a pair of tiny craters in the southeast. There is no central peak.

== Unnamed mound north of satellite crater Helmholtz F ==
An unnamed mound at 60° East / 63° South, immediately north of satellite crater Helmholtz F, could be observed during local sunset when the evening terminator runs at 65° East.

== Satellite craters ==
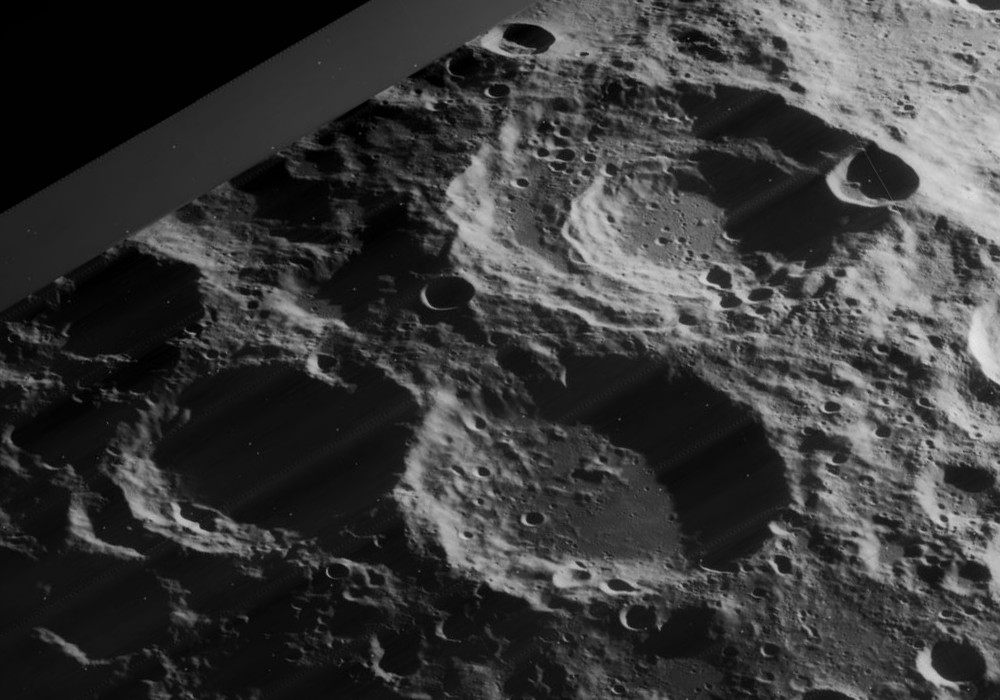
Oblique view of craters Boussingault (above right), Helmholtz (below right), and Neumayer (below left, mostly in shadow), facing southwest, from Lunar Orbiter 4

By convention these features are identified on lunar maps by placing the letter on the side of the crater midpoint that is closest to Helmholtz.

Helmholtz	Latitude	Longitude	Diameter	Ref
A	64.4° S	51.5° E	15.98 km	WGPSN
B	67.8° S	68.4° E	11.83 km	WGPSN
D	66.3° S	54.3° E	44.59 km	WGPSN
F	64.3° S	60.1° E	50 km	WGPSN
H	64.5° S	65.2° E	19.83 km	WGPSN
J	64.8° S	67.8° E	23.02 km	WGPSN
M	65.2° S	51.1° E	24.31 km	WGPSN
N	64.8° S	50.1° E	13.53 km	WGPSN
R	63.5° S	54.7° E	12.21 km	WGPSN
S	64.3° S	56.6° E	31.67 km	WGPSN
T	65.7° S	59.7° E	30.53 km	WGPSN

== See also ==
- 11573 Helmholtz, asteroid
