= Helmholtz theorem (classical mechanics) =

Thermodynamics-like result in classical mechanics

The Helmholtz theorem of classical mechanics reads as follows:

Let
$$H(x,p;V) = K(p) + \varphi(x;V)$$
be the Hamiltonian of a one-dimensional system, where
$$K = \frac{p^2}{2m}$$
is the kinetic energy and
$$\varphi(x;V)$$
is a "U-shaped" potential energy profile which depends on a parameter $V$. Let $\left\langle \cdot \right\rangle _{t}$ denote the time average. Let

- $E = K + \varphi,$
- $T = 2\left\langle K\right\rangle _{t},$
- $P = \left\langle -\frac{\partial \varphi }{\partial V}\right\rangle _{t},$
- $S(E,V)=\log \oint \sqrt{2m\left( E-\varphi \left( x,V\right) \right) }\,dx.$

Then
$$dS = \frac{dE+PdV}{T}.$$

== Remarks ==
The thesis of this theorem of classical mechanics reads exactly as the heat theorem of thermodynamics. This fact shows that thermodynamic-like relations exist between certain mechanical quantities. This in turn allows to define the "thermodynamic state" of a one-dimensional mechanical system. In particular the temperature $T$ is given by time average of the kinetic energy, and the entropy $S$ by the logarithm of the action (i.e., $\oint dx \sqrt{2m\left( E - \varphi \left( x, V\right) \right) }$).
The importance of this theorem has been recognized by Ludwig Boltzmann who saw how to apply it to macroscopic systems (i.e. multidimensional systems), in order to provide a mechanical foundation of equilibrium thermodynamics. This research activity was strictly related to his formulation of the ergodic hypothesis. A multidimensional version of the Helmholtz theorem, based on the ergodic theorem of George David Birkhoff is known as the generalized Helmholtz theorem.

== Generalized version ==
The generalized Helmholtz theorem is the multi-dimensional generalization of the Helmholtz theorem, and reads as follows.

Let

$$\mathbf{p}=(p_1,p_2,...,p_s),$$
$$\mathbf{q}=(q_1,q_2,...,q_s),$$

be the canonical coordinates of a s-dimensional Hamiltonian system, and let

$$H(\mathbf{p},\mathbf{q};V)=K(\mathbf{p})+\varphi(\mathbf{q};V)$$

be the Hamiltonian function, where

$$K=\sum_{i=1}^{s}\frac{p_i^2}{2m}$$,

is the kinetic energy and

$$\varphi(\mathbf{q};V)$$

is the potential energy which depends on a parameter $V$. Let the hyper-surfaces of constant energy in the 2s-dimensional phase space of the system be metrically indecomposable and let $\left\langle \cdot \right\rangle_t$ denote time average. Define the quantities $E$, $P$, $T$, $S$, as follows:

$$E = K + \varphi$$,

$$T = \frac{2}{s}\left\langle K\right\rangle _{t}$$,

$$P = \left\langle -\frac{\partial \varphi }{\partial V}\right\rangle _{t}$$,

$$S(E,V) = \log \int_{H(\mathbf{p},\mathbf{q};V) \leq E} d^s\mathbf{p}d^s \mathbf{q}.$$

Then:

$$dS = \frac{dE+PdV}{T}.$$
