= Demonax (crater) =

Lunar impact crater

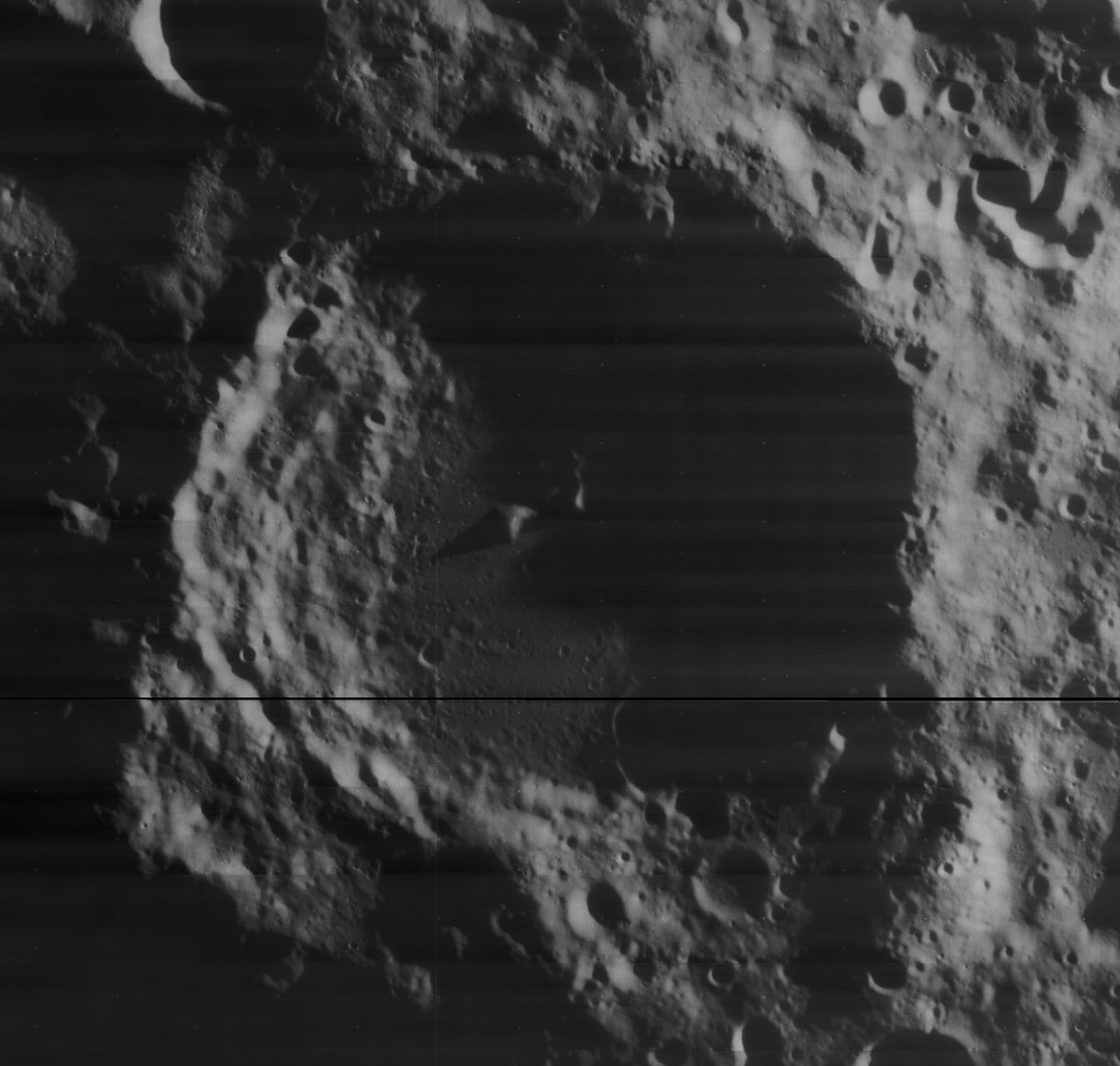
- Mosaic of Lunar Orbiter 4 images
- Coordinates: 78.2°S 59.0°E
- Diameter: 121.93 km (75.76 mi)
- Depth: 2.9 km (1.8 mi)
- Colongitude: 310° at sunrise
- Eponym: Demonax

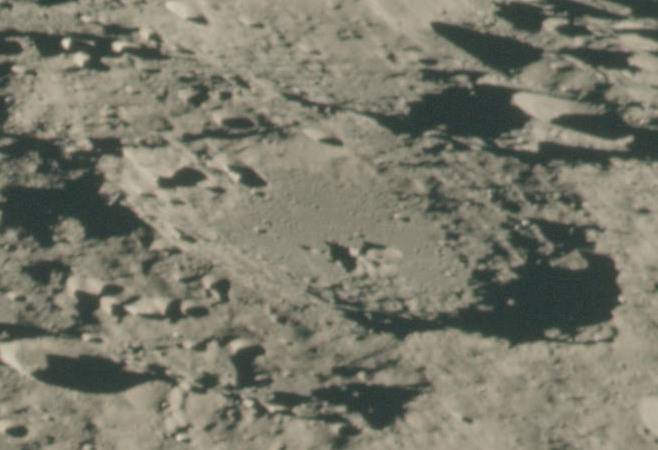
Oblique view of Demonax from Apollo 15, facing southwest

Demonax is a large lunar impact crater near the southern limb of the Moon. This location makes the crater difficult to observe due to foreshortening, and visibility is impacted by libration. The crater is also illuminated at a very low angle, when it is in the sunlit side. Due to the low angle of sunlight reaching this crater, the inner wall along the north side receives very little illumination. Demonax lies just to the north of the crater Scott, one of the south polar formations. To the north-northwest is Boguslawsky.

This crater primarily consists of anorthosite with patches of mare basalts. It has a worn and eroded rim, with several small craters lying along the edge and the inner walls. The southeast rim in particular has a notable collection of impacts, including the satellite crater Demonax A which intrudes into the interior floor. The crater bottom has been resurfaced, leaving a flat, level floor. However, there is a group of central peaks near the midpoint, and the northern part of the floor is rough and hummocky. The remains of some terraces are visible along the western interior floor.

This formation is named after the Greek philosopher Demonax (fl. 2nd century A.D.). His name was introduced through the lunar nomenclature of Johann F. J. Schmidt in 1878. Its designation was formally adopted by the International Astronomical Union in 1935.

== Satellite craters ==
By convention these features are identified on lunar maps by placing the letter on the side of the crater midpoint that is closest to Demonax.

Demonax	Latitude	Longitude	Diameter
A	79.1° S	64.3° E	16 km
B	81.5° S	73.9° E	19 km
C	80.1° S	54.9° E	10 km
E	78.3° S	43.4° E	40 km
