= Scott (crater) =

Lunar surface depression

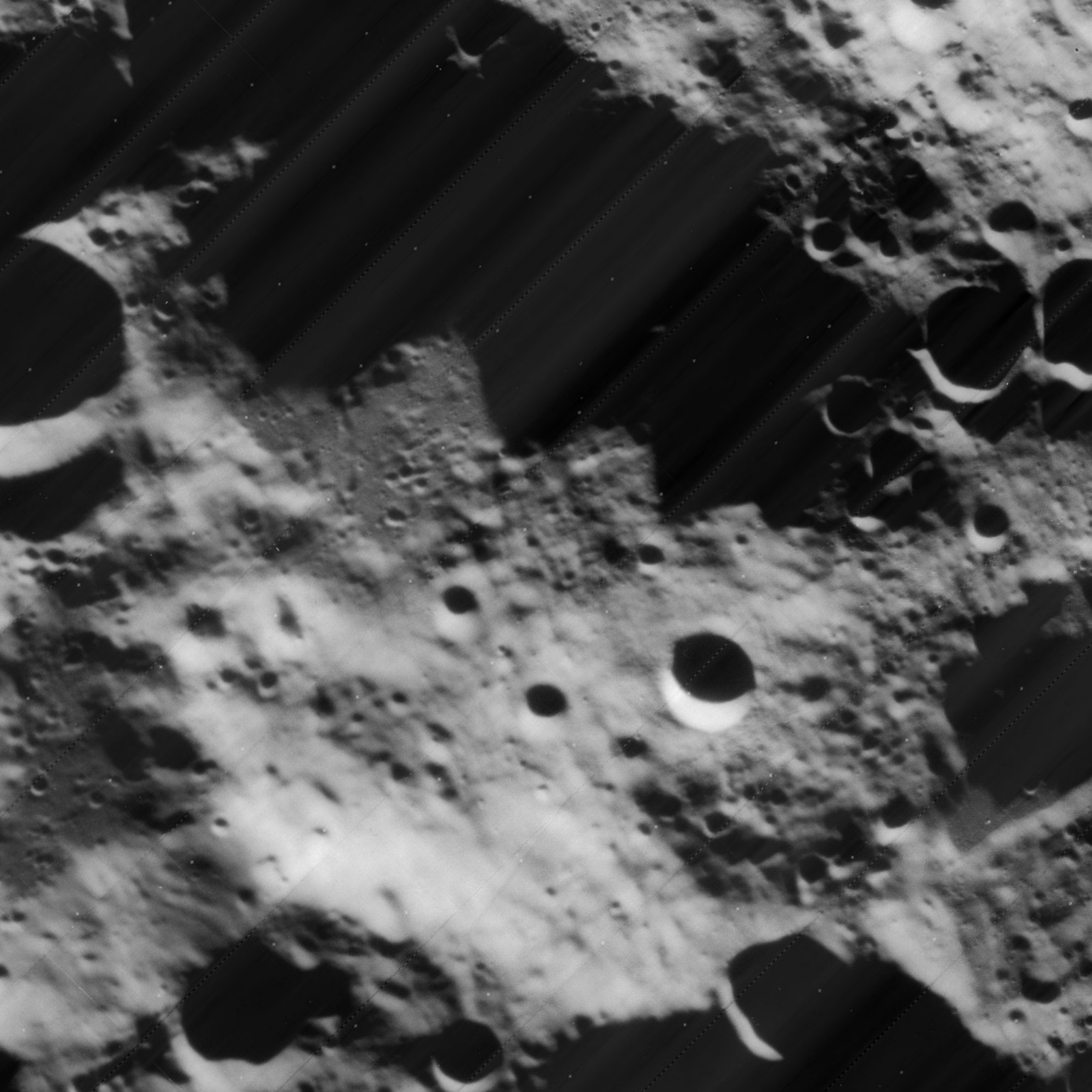
- Lunar Orbiter 4 image with north at top
- Coordinates: 81.9°S 45.3°E
- Diameter: 108 km
- Depth: Unknown
- Colongitude: 325° at sunrise
- Eponym: Robert F. Scott

Scott is a lunar impact crater near the south pole of the Moon. Its location close to the lunar limb hinders observation, both from the foreshortening of the crater as seen from Earth and from the limited sunlight that enters the basin. The northern end of this crater is in near perpetual darkness, and has not been mapped in detail. Scott lies between the similar-sized crater Amundsen to the southeast and Schomberger to the northwest. Just to the northeast is the crater Demonax.

The rim of this crater has been heavily eroded and the features are worn and irregular, although the crater basin remains roughly circular. There are several crater formations attached to the west and northwest outer rim, the most well-formed of which is the satellite crater Scott E. There is also a small crater along the southeast inner wall, and several tiny craterlets across the inner floor. The interior surface is rougher at the southern end, and grows smoother and flatter toward the shadow-cloaked north end. There is no central peak at the crater midpoint.

This crater is named after British antarctic explorer Robert Falcon Scott (1868–1912). The placement of Scott, both in relation to Amundsen and the lunar south pole, relates to the Antarctic explorers Roald Amundsen and Scott, and their race to be the first humans to reach Earth's South Pole.

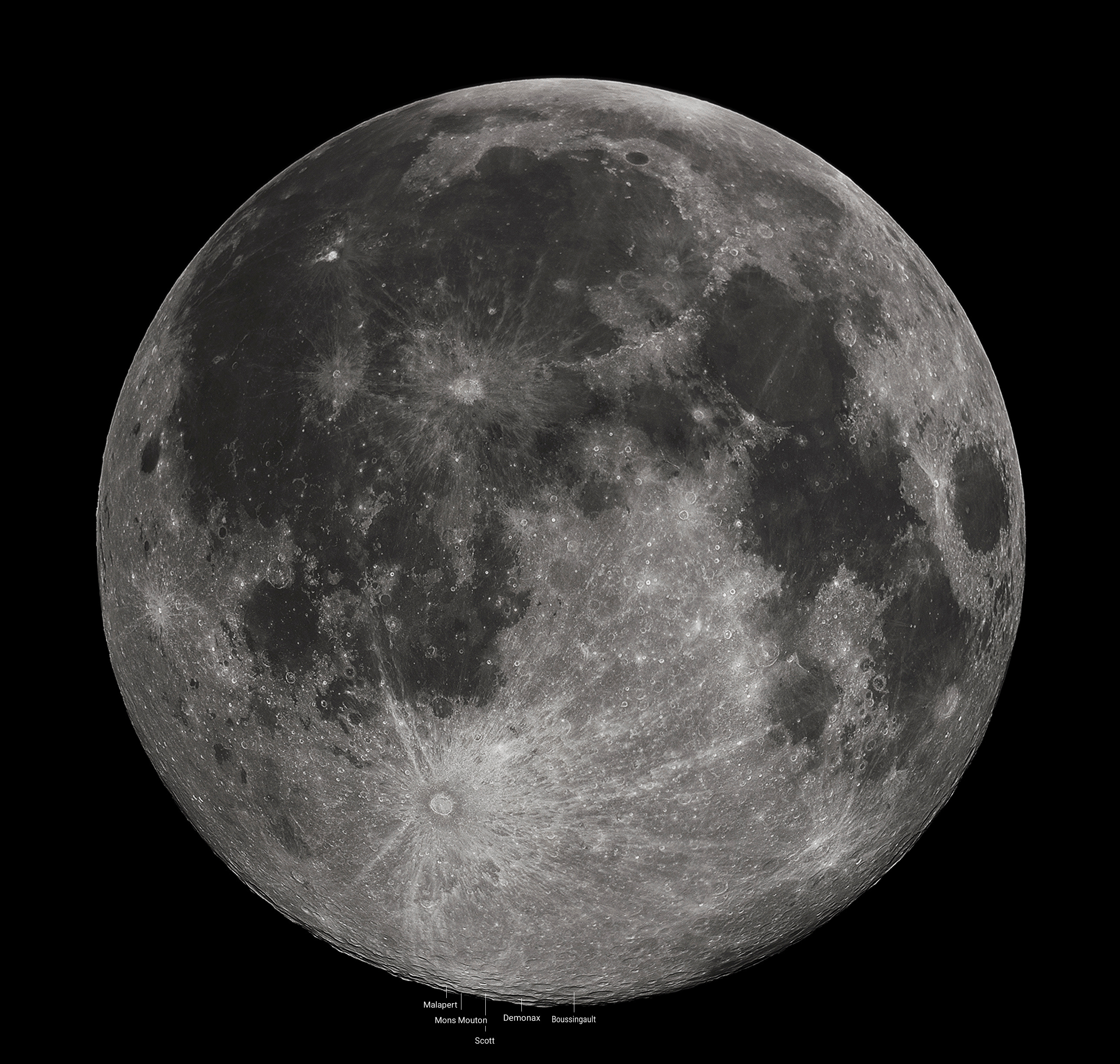
Scott as viewed from Earth

== Satellite craters ==
By convention these features are identified on lunar maps by placing the letter on the side of the crater midpoint that is closest to Scott.

Scott	Latitude	Longitude	Diameter
E	81.1° S	35.5° E	28 km
M	84.3° S	39.7° E	16 km

The following craters have been renamed by the IAU.

- Scott A — See Nobile.
