= List of ISRO missions =

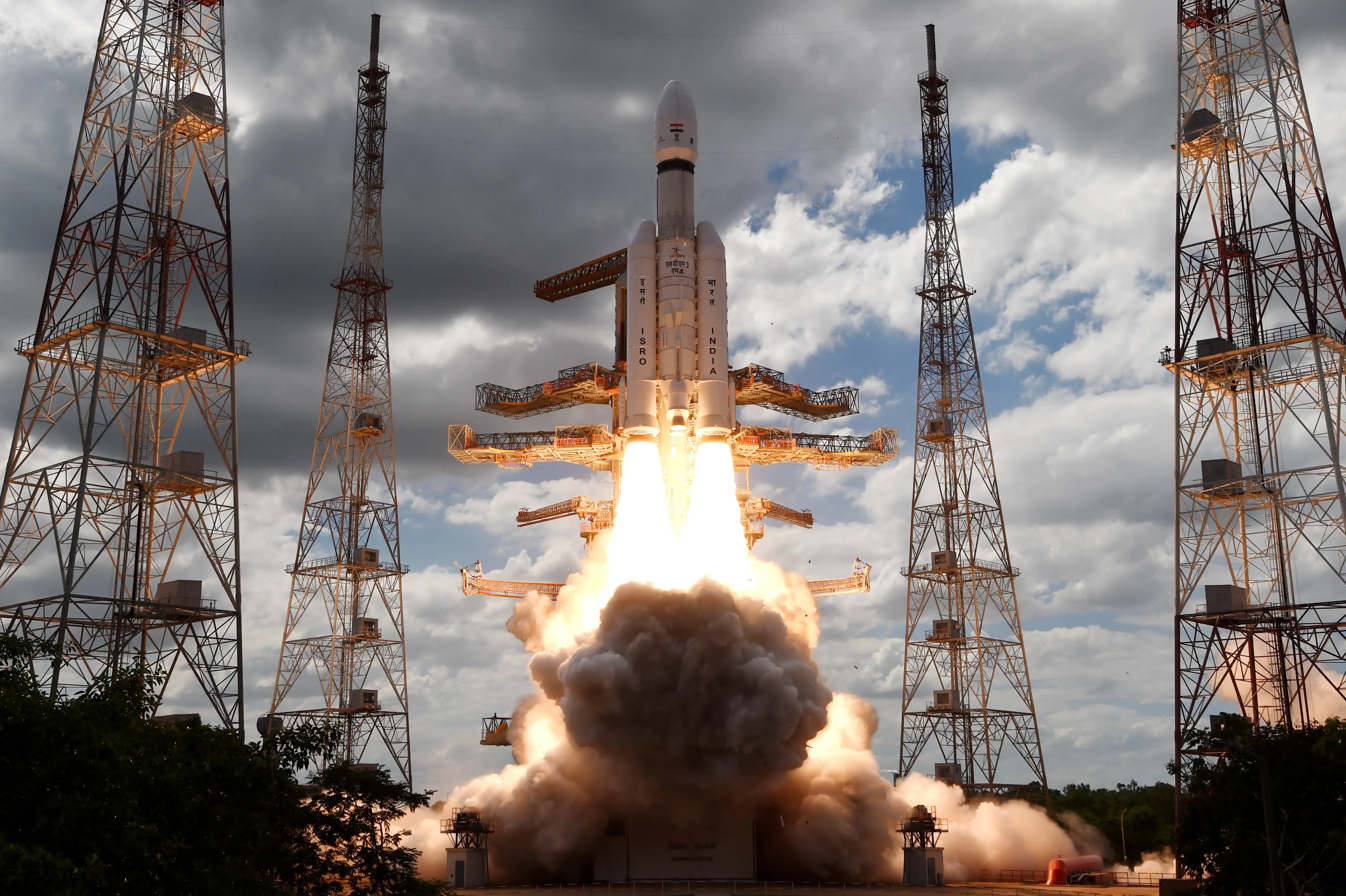
Chandrayaan-3 - Launch vehicle lifting off from Sriharikota

This is a list of ISRO missions. ISRO has carried out 136 spacecraft missions, 106 launch missions and planned several missions including the Gaganyaan (crewed/robotic) and Interplanetary mission such as Chandrayaan-4, Lunar Polar Exploration Mission, Venus Orbiter Mission and Mars Lander Mission.

== Completed missions ==
=== Human Spaceflight ===
Mission Name	Start date	End date	Details
Axiom Mission 4	25 June 2025	15 July 2025	Ax‑4 represents a milestone for India's Indian Human Spaceflight Programme, integrating with ISRO's Gaganyaan initiative. While Gaganyaan remains India's independent crewed program, Ax‑4 provided the first opportunity for an Indian astronaut—Shubhanshu Shukla—to fly on a commercial mission to the ISS. In his 18-day stay aboard the ISS, Shukla conducted various experiments developed by ISRO and Indian institutions, including studies of cognitive effects of screen use, microbial adaptation, muscle atrophy, and crop resilience in microgravity.

=== Earth ===
Mission Name	Start date	End date	Details
NISAR	30 July 2025	Ongoing	NASA-ISRO Synthetic Aperture Radar (NISAR) is a joint project between NASA and ISRO to co-develop and launch a dual-frequency synthetic aperture radar satellite that is used for remote sensing. It is notable for being the first dual-band radar imaging satellite.

=== Lunar ===
Mission Name		Start date	End date	Details
Chandrayaan programme	Chandrayaan-1	22 October 2008	28 August 2009	Chandrayaan 1 as India's first lunar probe. It was launched by the Indian Space Research Organisation on 22 October 2008, and was operated until August 2009. The mission included a lunar orbiter and an impactor. The mission was a major boost to India's space program, as India researched and developed its own technology in order to explore the Moon. The vehicle was successfully inserted into lunar orbit on 8 November 2008.
Chandrayaan programme	Chandrayaan-2	22 July 2019	Orbiter functional; the lander crashed onto Moon's surface due to loss of control (caused by a software glitch) during the final phase of descent.	Chandrayaan-2 was launched from the second launch pad at Satish Dhawan Space Centre on 22 July 2019 at 2:43 PM IST (09:13 UTC) to the Moon by a LVM3 (previously known as GSLV Mk III). The planned or by bit has a perigee of 169.7 km and an apogee of 45475 km. It consists of a lunar orbiter, lander and rover, all developed in India. The main scientific objective is to map the location and abundance of lunar water.
Chandrayaan programme	Chandrayaan-3	14 July 2023	10 November 2023 (Orbiter exited lunar sphere of influence)	Chandrayaan-3 was launched from the Satish Dhawan Space Centre, Sriharikota on 14 July 2023 at 14:35 IST (UTC +5:30) by LVM3 M4. The main scientific objective is to demonstrate end-to-end capability in safe landing and roving on the lunar surface. The Chandrayaan-3 successfully landed on moon on 23 August 2023 at 18:05 IST (UTC +5:30). For technology demonstration experiments, hop experiment on the Vikram Lander was conducted and the Propulsion Module (PM) of Chandrayaan-3 was moved from an orbit around Moon to an orbit around Earth, where it operated until 22 August 2024.

=== Solar ===
Mission Name	Start date	End date	Details
Aditya-L1	2 September 2023	Ongoing	Aditya-L1 is the first Indian observatory class mission to study the solar corona using a solar coronagraph and also chromosphere using near UV instrument. X-ray spectroscopic instruments will provide flare spectra while the in-situ payload observes the solar events during their passage from Sun to Earth. On 6 January 2024, Aditya-L1 spacecraft, India's first solar mission, has successfully entered its final orbit around the first Sun-Earth Lagrangian point (L1), approximately 1.5 million kilometers from Earth.

=== Interplanetary ===
Mission Name	Start date	End date	Details
Mars Orbiter Mission	5 November 2013	2 October 2022	Mars Orbiter Mission (MOM), also called Mangalyaan, is a spacecraft orbiting Mars since 24 September 2014. It was launched on 5 November 2013 by the Indian Space Research Organization (ISRO). It is India's first interplanetary spaceflight mission and ISRO has become the fourth space agency to reach Mars, after the Soviet space program, NASA, and the European Space Agency. India is the first Asian nation to reach Mars orbit, and the first nation in the world to do so in its first attempt.

=== Astronomy ===
Mission Name	Start date	End date	Details
AstroSat	28 September 2015	Ongoing	ASTROSAT is an Indian Astronomy satellite mission launched by ISRO on 28 September 2015, which enabled multi-wavelength observations of the celestial bodies and cosmic sources in X-ray and UV spectral bands simultaneously. The scientific payloads cover the Visible (3500–6000 Å...), UV (1300–op Å...), soft and hard X-ray regimes (0.5–8 keV; 3–80 keV). The uniqueness of ASTROSAT lies in its wide spectral coverage extending over visible, UV, soft and hard X-ray regions.
XPoSat	1 January 2024	Ongoing	The X-ray Polarimeter Satellite (XPoSat) is a ISRO space observatory to study polarization of cosmic X-rays. It was launched on 1 January 2024 on a Polar Satellite Launch Vehicle (PSLV-C58). XPoSat will study the 50 brightest known sources in the universe, including pulsars, black hole X-ray binaries, active galactic nuclei, and non-thermal supernova remnants.

== Planned missions ==
Mission name	Expected launch	Spacecraft	Details
Gaganyaan 1	Q4 2026	Test flight (uncrewed)	Gaganyaan ("Orbital Vehicle") is an Indian crewed orbital spacecraft (jointly made by ISRO and HAL) intended to be the basis of the Indian Human Spaceflight Programme. The spacecraft is being designed to carry three people, and a planned upgraded version will be equipped with rendezvous and docking capability. This will be the first of three flight tests prior to the inaugural of crewed mission.
Gaganyaan-2	2026	Test flight (uncrewed)	Second of the three flight tests prior to the inaugural crewed mission.
Gaganyaan 3	2026	Test flight (uncrewed)	Last of the three flight tests prior to the inaugural crewed mission.
Gaganyaan 4	2027	Test flight (crewed)	First crewed Gaganyaan mission. If successful, India would become the fourth country in the world (after the US, Soviet Union and China) to independently send humans in space.
Chandrayaan-4	2027	Lunar lander, sample return	Chandrayaan-4 is a planned lunar sample-return mission of the Indian Space Research Organisation (ISRO) and will be the fourth iteration in its Chandrayaan programme. It consist of four modules namely Transfer module (TM), Lander module (LM), Ascender module (AM) and Reentry Module (RM).
Venus Orbiter Mission	29 March 2028	Venus orbiter	The Venus Orbiter Mission is a planned orbiter to study the atmosphere of Venus.
Lunar Polar Exploration Mission	2028–29	Lunar lander, rover	Lunar Polar Exploration Mission, known as Chandrayaan-5 in India, is a proposed mission by JAXA and ISRO to explore the south pole region of the Moon. The mission concept has been formally proposed for funding and planning.
Bharatiya Antariksh Station	2028–2035	Space station	The Bharatiya Antariksh Station (referred in the media as Indian Space Station) is a planned space station to be constructed by India and operated by the (ISRO). The space station would weigh 20 tonnes and maintain an orbit of approximately 400 kilometres above the Earth, where astronauts could stay for 15–20 days.
AstroSat-2	TBD	Space telescope	AstroSat-2 is India's second dedicated multi-wavelength space telescope, proposed by the Indian Space Research Organization (ISRO) as the successor of the current Astrosat-1 observatory. ISRO launched an 'Announcement of Opportunity in February 2018 requesting proposals from Indian scientists for ideas and the development of instruments for astronomy and astrophysics.
Mars Lander Mission	2030	Mars Lander, Rover, Helicopter	Mars Lander Mission also called as Mangalyaan 2 is India's second interplanetary mission planned for launch to Mars. It will have a lander along with a rover and a helicopter like Ingenuity (NASA) and will demonstrate the capability of landing on Mars.

== Other missions ==
There are also various Indian satellite which contain science related instruments as secondary payloads. The main objective of these satellites are not Space Science. For example, an X-ray payload was flown aboard Aryabhata, the first Indian satellite.

The STS-51-B Space Shuttle Challenger mission consisted of Anuradha, an Indian Cosmic Ray Experiment. It consisted of a Barrel shaped recorder consisting of plastic sheets. It detected cosmic rays at the rate of seven a minute for 64 hours and produced 10000 sheets of data.

In the SROSS-C2, satellite of the Stretched Rohini Satellite Series, a Gamma-ray burst detector was flown.

== See also ==
- Indian Space Research Organisation
- List of Indian satellites
- List of foreign satellites launched by India
- List of Satish Dhawan Space Centre launches
- List of NASA missions
- List of European Space Agency programmes and missions
