= Chandrayaan-4 =

Indian lunar sample-return mission

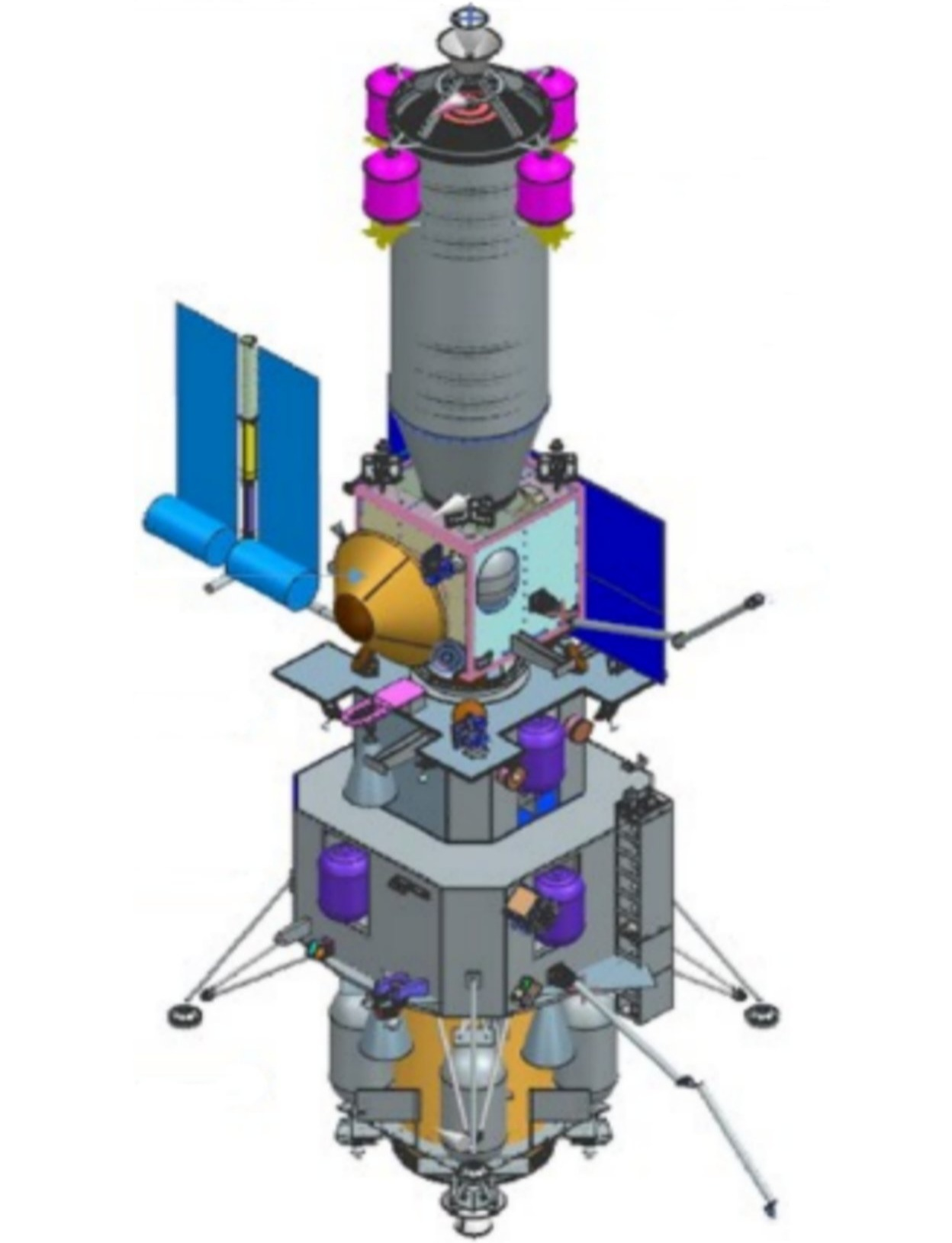
- Chandrayaan-4 Integrated Module'; The LAM of transfer module seen on top and its re-entry cone is shown in golden brown. The ascender-lander-propulsion modules are seen beneath it in downward succession
- Mission type: Lunar sample return
- Operator: ISRO

Spacecraft properties
- Bus: Chandrayaan
- Manufacturer: ISRO
- Launch mass: 9,600 kg (combined)

Start of mission
- Launch date: 2028 (planned)
- Rocket: 2 × LVM3 SC
- Launch site: Satish Dhawan Space Centre
- Contractor: ISRO

End of mission
- Landing date: 2028 (planned)

Chandrayaan-4 (CHUN-drə-YAHN /ˌtʃʌndrəˈjɑːn/;; from Sanskrit: Chandra, "Moon" and yāna, "craft, vehicle") is an upcoming lunar sample return mission of ISRO underdevelopment now and the fourth iteration in its Chandrayaan programme. As of January 2025, the conceptualisation phase has been completed, and the design phase is nearing completion. The mission is expected to launch around 2028. It is planned to return up to 3 kg (6.6 lb) of lunar regolith.

== History ==
=== Conceptual Phase ===
The plan for a lunar sample return mission was revealed by the director of the Space Application Centre (SAC), Nilesh M Desai on 17 November 2023 during the 62nd foundation ceremony of the Indian Institute of Tropical Meteorology (IITM) in Pune. This was confirmed by S. Somanath, the then chairman of ISRO, during the National Space Science Symposium held in Goa on 26 February 2024. He said that the mission is extremely challenging as it incorporates multiple launches, docking capability and robotic capability. He expressed the confidence buildup over the success of 'hop' operation of the lander and Earth return operation performed by the propulsion module of Chandrayaan-3.

After the launch of INSAT-3DS, the chairman stated the insufficiency of the rocket capability leading to a 'novel design' for this mission and the secretary of the Department of Space (DoS) said that the mission incorporates 'high-end technology' and it is pending government approval for him to have a final word. Somanath stated that the mission demands docking capability both in Earth and lunar orbits and the agency is planning to demonstrate this capability through Space Docking Experiment (SPADEX) which is slated for launch by year end.

On 20 August 2024, S. Somanath announced that the Indian Space Research Organisation (ISRO) had completed the design of both Chandrayaan-4 and LUPEX, and would request approval from the government.

==== Cabinet approval ====
On 18 September 2024, Chandrayaan-4 received approval from the Union Cabinet, chaired by Prime Minister Narendra Modi for ₹2,104.06 crore (equivalent to ₹22 billion or US$230 million in 2026) and is expected to be completed within 36 months. The mission will have five modules that will be carried to space on two different launches. The mission is designed to land on the lunar surface, collect samples, store them in a vacuum-sealed container, and return them to Earth. The mission will also see docking and undocking phases in lunar orbit.

==== Design and Development ====
On 13 February 2025, the Indian Minister of Science and Technology, Jitendra Singh Rana, stated in the Rajya Sabha that Chandrayaan-4 will be a foundational mission that will validate key technologies needed for a crewed lunar landing in 2040. As of February 2025, ISRO is developing a number of subsystems, such as robotic arms for sample collection, specialized payloads, and a high-capacity propulsion system. ISRO organised a research meet in April 2025 to deliberate on the scientific research that can be conducted with the lunar regolith within India. Further mission details were planned and executed at an ISRO National meet in September 2026.

== Mission Objectives ==
The aim of the mission is to collect samples from the lunar surface and bring the samples safely to Earth for scientific studies. The objectives of this mission are:

1. To perform a safe and soft landing on the lunar surface.
2. To demonstrate lunar sample collection and containerization.
3. To demonstrate ascent from the Moon's surface.
4. To demonstrate docking and undocking in lunar orbit.
5. To demonstrate the transfer of samples from one module to another.
6. To demonstrate return and re-entry to Earth for sample delivery.

== Spacecraft ==
The mission will be launched in two phases onboard two LVM3 rockets developed by ISRO. The spacecraft will include five modules packed into two composites, which will be launched separately, using two separate LVM 3 launch vehicles. As an Individual LVM3 rocket has a payload capacity of only 8,000 kilograms, exceeding the combined fuel mass and size of the spacecraft. Hence the flight was optimised for a dual-launch strategy. The spacecraft elements include:

- Propulsion Module is similar to the propulsion module on Chandrayaan-3. It will ferry the combined modular spacecraft to the moon.
- Lander Module will land on the Moon with instrumentation. It supports the ascent stage along with the soil sampling instrumentation. It is designed to last 1 lunar day or 14 Earth days on the moon. The Lander module will be equipped with a scoop and a drill to obtain lunar samples.
- Ascender Module will eject from the lander and launch from the Moon using the lander as a launch pad after the samples from the Moon are collected and stored. It will then enter low-lunar orbit.
- Transfer Module will collect the samples from the ascent stage, transfer them to the re-entry module, fire its engine to set both itself and the re-entry module towards Earth, release the payload and loop back around the Earth.
- Re-entry Module will hold the sample from lunar orbit. It is designed to survive atmospheric re-entry and land with the lunar regoliths.

The first launch is planned to carry the ascender module and descender module. The second launch would carry the transfer module, re-entry module, and propulsion module. The final spacecraft will be assembled into an integrated module by docking in Earth orbit before proceeding to the Moon. This will be done via Earth-orbit docking maneuvers.

Once the spacecraft reaches lunar orbit, the lander/ascender stack will descent to the lunar surface. It is planned that after touchdown, a robotic arm, mounted on the Lander Module, will scoop about 2–3 kg of samples from around the landing site and transfer them to a container on the Ascent Module. In addition, a drilling mechanism will collect sub-surface samples and transfer them to another container in the Ascent Module. The Ascent module would lift-off just prior to the end of a lunar day for a lunar orbit rendezvous with the Transfer module, which will transfer the payload to a Re-entry module before departing from the moon and landing on earth.

Apart from the propulsion module, the transfer module is also equipped with an onboard Liquid Apogee Motor (LAM) for return operation manoeuvres, including the trans-Earth injection. As per earlier reports, the lander module will have six throttleable landing thrusters capable of producing 800 newtons of thrust each, while the ascender module will have two lift off thrusters capable of producing 800 newtons of fixed thrust each. The integrated assembly of all modules after docking in Earth orbit is expected to weigh at least 9,200 kg (20,300 lb).

== Landing site ==
The landing site was initially planned near to Station Shiv Shakti, the landing site of Chandrayaan-3 which is located between the Manzinus P and Boguslawsky M lunar craters near to the south pole region. ISRO had conducted comprehensive study of this landing site region regarding morphology, hydration and gravity anomalies using data obtained from payloads of Chandrayaan-2 orbiter, Lunar Reconnaissance Orbiter (LRO), Lunar Prospector and GRAIL. ISRO also evaluated landing the spacecraft at Chandrayaan-3's and Chandrayaan-2's alternate landing sites.

It was proposed in 2026 to land the spacecraft in the Mountainous plains near Mons Mouton of the moon, based on data from the OHRC instrument on the Chandrayaan-2 orbiter and SIS datasets, located even closer to the lunar south pole.Five sites were evaluated of which four were selected, after it was discovered that one of them was in a shadowed region, impeding solar power generation. Of the other given sites, MM4 was suggested as the landing site. Researchers from IIT Kharagpur and PRL surveyed the sites for iron and titanium-rich rocks known as ilmenite-bearing cumulates (IBC), about 4.3–4.4 billion years old that may have preserved records of the moon's early history. There is also potential for samples to have lunar water content within them. All the newly proposed sites are expected to be near permanently shadowed regions on the moon.

Comparison of survey data of the newly proposed landing sites for Chandrayaan-4
Site	Orbital Survey pass	Date of pass	Orbiter Orientation (Pitch, Yaw, Roll)	Observation elevation	Observation Azimuth	Latitude	Longitude	Hazard%	Safe areas (24m x 24m grid)	Mean Slope	Height range	Mean height
MM1	23366	18-11 2025	12.00, 0.00 ,−1.5	3.4	300.9	−84.944	25.11	12.24	502	5.2°	4477 – 4891	4857
MM1	23367	18-11 2025	−11.90, 0.01, 3.2	4.5	306.3	−84.944	25.11	12.24	502	5.2°	4477 – 4891	4857
MM3	23356	17-11; 2025	14.50, 0.01, 9.9	3.5	300.2	−84.745	29.297	12.23	126	6.3°	5084 – 5322	5204
MM3	23357	17-11; 2025	−14.6, 0.01, 8.2	4.9	306.1	−84.745	29.297	12.23	126	6.3°	5084 – 5322	5204
MM4	23353	17-11; 2025	17.2, 0.02, 7.9	3.7	301.1	−84.289	32.808	9.89	568	5.0°	5274 – 5386	5334
MM4	23354	17-11; 2025	−17.1, 0.01, 6.3	5.2	307	−84.289	32.808	9.89	568	5.0°	5274 – 5386	5334
MM5	23344	16-11; 2025	19.4, 0.03, 16.3	3.4	301.5	−84.641	36.17	12.75	72	5.38°	6074– 6223	6162
MM5	23345	16-11; 2025	−19.8,0.03, 15.2	5.2	307.8	−84.641	36.17	12.75	72	5.38°	6074– 6223	6162

Factors affecting landing site selection include

- Slope less than or up to 10 degrees
- Boulders less than 0.32 metres (1 ft 1 in)
- Low Crater and boulder distribution in local topography
- Sunlit for at least 11–12 days.
- Local terrain features don’t shadow the site for long
- Distribution of safe grid of 24 by 24 metres (79 ft × 79 ft) inside 1 by 1 kilometre (0.62 mi × 0.62 mi) landing area

== See also ==
- Chandrayaan programme
- List of missions to the Moon
- Lunar Polar Exploration Mission

=== Similar missions ===
- Chang'e 5
- Chang'e 6
- Luna 16
- Luna 20
- Luna 24
