= RESPOND =

Indian sponsoree research program

- Country: India
- Key people: Dr. Ganesh Raj (Director)
- Launched: 1976
- Budget: Rs. 24 Crore (2015-16)
- Status: Active
- Website: www.isro.gov.in/sponsored-research-respond

RESPOND is a sponsored research program of Indian Space Research Organization. ISRO started the RESPOND (Research Sponsored) programme in the 1970s whose main objective is to establish strong links with Universities/Institutions in the country to carry out quality research and developmental projects which are of relevance to space and derive useful outputs of such R&D to support ISRO programmes. The programme provides opportunity to the non-ISRO scientists and engineers, who are working with the recognized institute, to contribute to the Indian space programme. The contribution is mostly in areas of design and development of orbiting satellites for scientific research and space applications, sounding rockets and satellite launch vehicles. Non-academic R & D institutions can also participate in this programme.

== History ==
To encourage space related activities in academic institutions, ISRO started RESPOND programme in 1970s. The programme is being administered by Physical Research Laboratory since 1976. Under this programme, space technology cells were established in various academic institutions in India which are guided by Joint Policy Committee which is chaired by Director/Vice Chancellor of the respective institution and scientists from ISRO and Department of Space. The projects undertaken under RESPOND Programme at Space Applications Centre are related to payload development, data processing and applications in the areas of Satcom, Satnav & Remote Sensing.

== Overview ==
Under RESPOND, ISRO sponsors space projects which are implemented at various institutions. At present, 84 space sciences projects have been supported by ISRO of which 62 are being carried out by universities and rest of 22 by R&D institutions. The programme has supported nearly 106 conferences and symposiums. The research is carried out in the domains of Astronomy, Astrophysics, Solar Physics, Earth's middle atmosphere and Ionosphere. Some of the projects undertaken under this programme are:

- Detection of pests and diseases for precision crop management using remote sensing techniques.
- Analysis of Satellite derived wind and wave parameters for coastal waters off Karnataka.
- Reconstruction of 3-D objects from Stereo space imagery for development of city models.
- Application of remote sensing techniques in assessment of landscape dynamics along the Indo-Myanmar Ranges.
- Geospatial Technology for mineral exploration program in Singhbhum Shear Zone.
- Development of a remote sensing and GIS based approach for flood forecasting and warning for Lower Tapi basin.
- Morpho-tectonic evaluation of the Kosi river basin, Bihar using remote sensing data.
- Earthquake Damage Scenario Analysis for Chennai city using Remote sensing & GIS techniques.
- Design feasibility study and realization of a single directional antenna for L and S bands relevant to space communication.
- Strengthening of Aluminum Alloy 6061 Carbon Nanotubes composites.
- Control of flexible and reconfigurable Parabolic Antenna.

== Supported areas of Research ==
Research proposals are supported by ISRO in relevant areas of space sciences, some of them are:

- Space science: Physics of the ionosphere and magnetosphere; meteorology, dynamics of the atmosphere; geophysics, geology; astronomy; cosmology; astrophysics; planetary and interplanetary space physics and climatology
- Space technology: Rocket and satellite technology; propulsion systems design and optimization; aerodynamics and heat transfer problems related to space vehicles; guidance and control systems for launch vehicles and spacecraft; polymer chemistry, propellant technology; ultra-light-weight structure; satellite energy systems; space electronics, Space communication systems; orbital mechanics, computer sciences and new material development.
- Space Application : Remote sensing of the earth's resources: space communication; satellite geodesy image processing, satellite meteorology including weather forecasting, Space Education and Ecology

== Participating Institutions ==
At present, Following is the list of institutes which are supported by ISRO under RESPOND programme.

- Indian Institute of Technology Bombay
- Indian Institute of Technology Kanpur
- Indian Institute of Technology Kharagpur
- Indian Institute of Technology Madras
- Indian Institute of Science Bangalore
- National Institute of Technology Tiruchirappalli
- University of Pune

Below is the list of R&D institutions which are either guiding an educational institute or independently carrying out the research under this programme:

- Liquid Propulsion Systems Centre
- National Remote Sensing Centre
- Physical Research Laboratory
- Space Applications Centre
- Vikram Sarabhai Space Centre
