= Quantum Experiments using Satellite Technology =

Indian Quantum satellite

Quantum Experiment using Satellite Technology was launched in 2017 by the Raman Research Institute. In February 2021, the project demonstrated quantum communication for 50 m apart, and on 19 March 2021 for 300 m apart inline of sight in the Space Applications Centre, which was done in coordination with the Indian Space Research Organisation, Indian Institute of Science and Tata Institute of Fundamental Research. Quantum Experiment using Satellite Technology is India's first project on satellite based long distance quantum communication.

== Technical specifications ==
1. Indigenously developed NAVIC receiver for time synchronization
2. Gimbal mechanism system instead of large aperture telescope for optical alignment.
3. Shared quantum secure text.
4. Shared image transmission.
5. Quantum assisted two ways video conferencing at the Space Applications Centre and Physical Research Laboratory
6. It used robust and high brightness entangled photon source, used BBM92 protocol implementation NAVIC enabled synchronization polarization compensation technique.
7. It is hack proof as it uses quantum key distribution.
8. It uses quantum cryptography and carried out by Quantum information and computing (QuIC) lab.
