= Nilesh M. Desai =

Indian engineer and space scientist (born 1964)

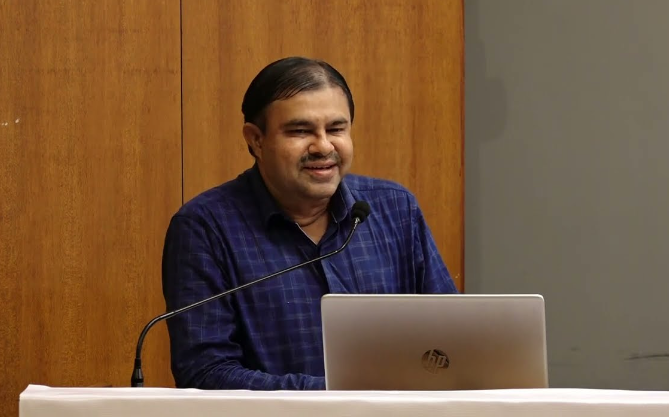
- Nilesh M. Desai Nilesh M. Desai, Former director of SAC, ISRO

13th Director of Space Applications Centre (SAC)
- In office 1 January 2021 – Retired 31 Mar 2026
- Preceded by: Dipak Kumar Das
- Succeeded by: Soumya Sarkar

Personal details
- Born: 1 April 1964 (age 62) Navsari, Gujarat, India
- Education: Lalbhai Dalpatbhai College of Engineering (B.Tech. in Electronics & Communication)

Nilesh M. Desai (born 1 April 1964) is an Indian engineer and space scientist, and the former director of the Space Applications Centre (SAC) in Ahmedabad, a research facility under the Indian Space Research Organisation (ISRO).

Desai's work includes contributions to microwave radar systems, the Indian Regional Navigation Satellite System, quantum key distribution, and lunar exploration missions such as Chandrayaan-3.

== Early life and education ==
Desai was born on 1 April 1964 in Navsari, Gujarat He earned his Bachelor of Engineering degree (B.E) from the L.D. College of Engineering (LDCE) in Gujarat. In 2023, Desai was awarded an honorary Doctor of Science degree by Bundelkhand University and in 2024 he was conferred with an honorary doctorate degree by the Gujarat Technological University (GTU).

== Career in Indian Space Research Organisation ==
Desai joined ISRO in 1986, initially working at SAC in ISRO's Microwave Remote Sensing Programme (MRSP). In his thirty-six years career at SAC, he has been involved in design and development of ISRO's Microwave Radar Systems, and realization of advanced applications involving earth observation, navigation and communication technologies for societal benefits, governance and strategic uses. He has successfully led the design and development of ISRO's airborne & Spaceborne Microwave Remote Sensing Payloads like including the RISAT-1 C-Band Synthetic-aperture radar (SAR), Oceansat-2, ScatSat-1, the Chandrayaan-2 Orbiter SAR, and systems related to Chandrayaan-3. He also played a role in realizing the NASA-ISRO Synthetic Aperture Radar, or NISAR satellite, a partnership between NASA and ISRO.

Desai's technical expertise extends to VLSI and semiconductor manufacturing, and he was involved in developing satellite-based quantum key distribution systems at ISRO.

Desai was appointed the director of Space Applications Centre in 2021, overseeing research and development of satellite applications in communication, navigation, and earth observation. He Superannuated on 31 Mar 2026.

== Indian Regional Navigation Satellite System ==
The Indian Regional Navigation Satellite System (IRNSS), named with the acronym NavIC (Navigation with Indian Constellation; also, nāvik 'sailor' or 'navigator' in Indian languages), is a regional satellite navigation system that provides accurate real-time positioning and timing services. It covers Indian mainland and regions extending 1,500 km (930mi) around it, with plans for further extension up to 3,000km (1,900 mi). The system currently consists of a constellation of eight satellites, with two additional satellites on ground as stand-by. The constellation is in orbit since 2018. NavIC will provide two levels of service, the "standard positioning service", which will be open for civilian use, and a "restricted service" (an encrypted one) for authorised users (including the military). Nilesh Desai as a deputy director at Space Applications Centre was responsible for the design & development of different types of real time data processing techniques, User Receivers for indigenous NavIC satellites. In a press interaction Desai mentioned that once NavIC will be fully operational, it will greatly benefit both the military and the general public. He pointed out that at present, locating a missing soldier can be quite challenging; however, once NavIC is operational, this can be much easier to address. A wristwatch-like device designed in Space Applications Centre will be provided to soldiers, which will continuously track and relay their location. Once this indigenously developed system will be operational, India will not need to rely on any foreign technology.

== Chandrayaan 2 ==
Chandrayaan-2 is the second lunar exploration mission developed by ISRO after Chandrayaan-1. The main scientific objective of the mission was to map and study the variations in lunar surface composition, as well as the location and abundance of lunar water. The preliminary configuration study of the lander was completed in 2013 during the tenure of Desai as deputy director by the Space Applications Centre (SAC) in Ahmedabad. This includes three major payloads and a crucial set of sensors and communication equipment that will be fitted on to the orbiter, lander and the rover. Chandrayaan-2 had three parts consisting of a lunar orbiter, lander and the rover. SAC developed communication equipment to help the rover interact with the lander while moving around on the moon's surface. Thus the lander can communicate to the orbiter and the orbiter can beam back the data to the earth.

== Chandrayaan 3 ==
Chandrayaan-3 is the third Indian mission in the Chandrayaan programme, a series of lunar-exploration missions developed by ISRO.The mission consists of Vikram, a lunar lander, and Pragyan, a lunar rover, as replacements for the equivalents on Chandrayaan-2. Under the leadership of Desai, Space Applications Centre (SAC) played a major role in developing several critical instruments for the Chandrayaan-3 mission, including the Alpha Particle X-ray Spectrometer (APXS) on the lander, the ChaSTE (Chandra's Surface Thermophysical Experiment) payload to measure lunar soil temperature, and the RAMBHA-LP (Radio Anatomy of Moon Bound Hypersensitive ionosphere and Neutral Composition–Langmuir Probe). SAC also played critical role in the landing process. The centre has developed a number of sensors on board the lander, including the hazard detection and avoidance camera and processing algorithm, which has helped safe and soft landing.

== Aditya-L1 ==
Aditya-L1 is a coronagraphy spacecraft designed and developed for studying the solar atmosphere, by ISRO and various other Indian Space Research Institutes. Space Applications Centre, under the leadership of Nilesh Desai made significant contributions to the Aditya-L1 mission, primarily through the development of its scientific payloads, advanced electronics, and spacecraft support systems. SAC has built key instruments such as the Solar Ultraviolet Imaging Telescope (SUIT) and major components of the ASPEX payload, including the Solar Wind Ion Spectrometer (SWIS) and STEPS sensors for measuring solar wind and energetic particles. The centre also contributed important electronics subsystems for the Visible Emission Line Coronagraph (VELC), supporting its integration with the spacecraft. Besides payloads, SAC scientists led by Dr Desai developed the Payload Data Handling System (PDHS) to manage, compress, store, and transmit scientific data. SAC under Desai's expertise also created robust S-band/X-band communication systems for telemetry, telecommand, and data downlink. Additionally, the team of engineers in SAC developed high-reliability onboard power electronics, processors, and health-monitoring systems that is helping the spacecraft in operating autonomously at the distant L1 point.

== NASA-ISRO Synthetic Aperture Radar (NISAR) ==
The NASA-ISRO Synthetic Aperture Radar (NISAR) mission is a joint project between NASA and ISRO where they co-developed and launched an Earth observation satellite (EOS) equipped with dual-frequency synthetic aperture radar (SAR) in 2025. It is the first radar imaging satellite that is using dual frequencies. The satellite used for remote sensing, to observe and understand natural processes on Earth. Under the leadership of Desai Space Applications Centre provided the mission's S-band instrument and the centre is also responsible for Spacecraft's calibration, data processing, and development of science algorithms to address the scientific goals of the mission. He is also one of the members of Project Management team of NISAR. According to Desai, Data generated by NISAR can be used for assessing the tectonic plate movement at the scale of centimetres with repeated scanning. At present there is no system to predict earthquakes, but the land deformation studies using the NISAR data will hopefully help the global community in saving lives and resources.

== Chandrayaan-4, Chandrayaan-5 (LUPEX), and Venus Orbiter Mission (Shukrayaan) ==
During an address to the Indian Tropical Meteorology Institute Desai highlighted the Chandrayaan-4 mission as a significant advancement. The Space Applications Centre is playing a crucial role in the mission that will involve the collection of samples from the lunar surface. He said in this mission the spacecraft will travel to the moon, safely land, collect samples, and then connect to another module in space. Finally the module will then return to Earth orbit. When the two modules approach Earth, they will separate, with one part returning to Earth and the other one will keep orbiting the planet. He also described about the Chandrayaan-4 rover, which will be 12 times heavier than Chandrayaan-3's Pragyan.

LuPEX will be a joint mission by ISRO and Japanese space agency JAXA to study the permanently shadowed regions in the vicinity of the lunar south pole. Desai in a while briefing the media told that, SAC is involved in the design of scientific instruments for LuPEX mission. He also said that, this future mission will explore the permanently shadowed regions in the vicinity of the lunar south pole. LUPEX will be launched using the Japanese H3 rocket, which would eventually land at the exact lunar south pole (90-degree latitude) and explore the permanently shadowed regions in the vicinity of the south pole, by performing drilling and in-situ experiments.

The Venus Orbiter Mission (VOM), unofficially known as Shukrayaan is a future mission of ISRO to study the surface and atmosphere of Venus. According to Desai: The Indian Space Research Organisation (ISRO) has received approval from the Government of India for Venus Orbiting Satellite mission, named Shukrayaan, which is scheduled for launch in 2028. As a part of the Mars mission, ISRO will not only put a satellite on the Mars orbit but will also attempt to do a safe landing on its surface.

== Outreach Activities ==
Desai, is an advocate of outreach activities related to Indian Space Programme, and during his tenure SAC has conducted various outreach activities. This includes promoting space science and technology to students and the public through events like the Smart India Hackathon (SIH), lectures, and exhibitions. Examples include spearheading outreach for SIH, leading the initiatives to set up ISRO labs in schools via programs like 'Space on Wheels', and inspiring students at events like Space Festival 2025. He is an advocate for popular lectures, student visits to SAC, and the organization of various events in the Vikram Sarabhai Space Exhibition. He took Initiatives to start an educational program aimed at students, named BHAVIKA:The "BHAvI Vaigyanik KAryakram" (Bhavya Vaigyanik Karyakram) or GujSAC BHAVIKA program, a joint mission by SAC and Gujarat Council on Science and Technology (GUJCOST) to promote science and space exploration among students. The first edition of BHAVIKA, that included a nine days residential programme for high school students was held in November 2025.

== Awards and honours ==
- ISRO Team Award for the RISAT-1 payload (2012)
- Bhaskara Award by Indian Society of Remote Sensing 2024.
- Lifetime Achievement Award from DVCon India (2023)
- ISRO Performance Excellence Award-2018
- ISRO Individual Merit Award-2010
- Dr. APJ Abdul Kalam Award for Outstanding Contribution to Indian Space programme-2023
- Lifetime Achievement Award-2023
- Lalbhai Dalpatbhai Ratna Award-2023
- Honorary Doctorate from Gujarat Technological University (GTU)
- Honorary Doctor of Science degree by Bundelkhand University.

== Professional affiliations ==
- Indian Society of Remote Sensing (ISRS)
- Indian Society of Geomatics (ISG)
- Astronautical Society of India (ASI)
- Indian Society of Systems for Science and Engineering (ISSE)
- National President of ISRS (2020–2022)
