= National Space Science Symposium =

National Space Science Symposium is a biennial convention organized by ISRO. The symposium is primarily for researchers working in the field of atmospheric, space and planetary sciences, astronomy and astrophysics, solar system bodies and their exploration.
