= Lunar Polar Exploration Mission =

Lunar exploration mission by India and Japan

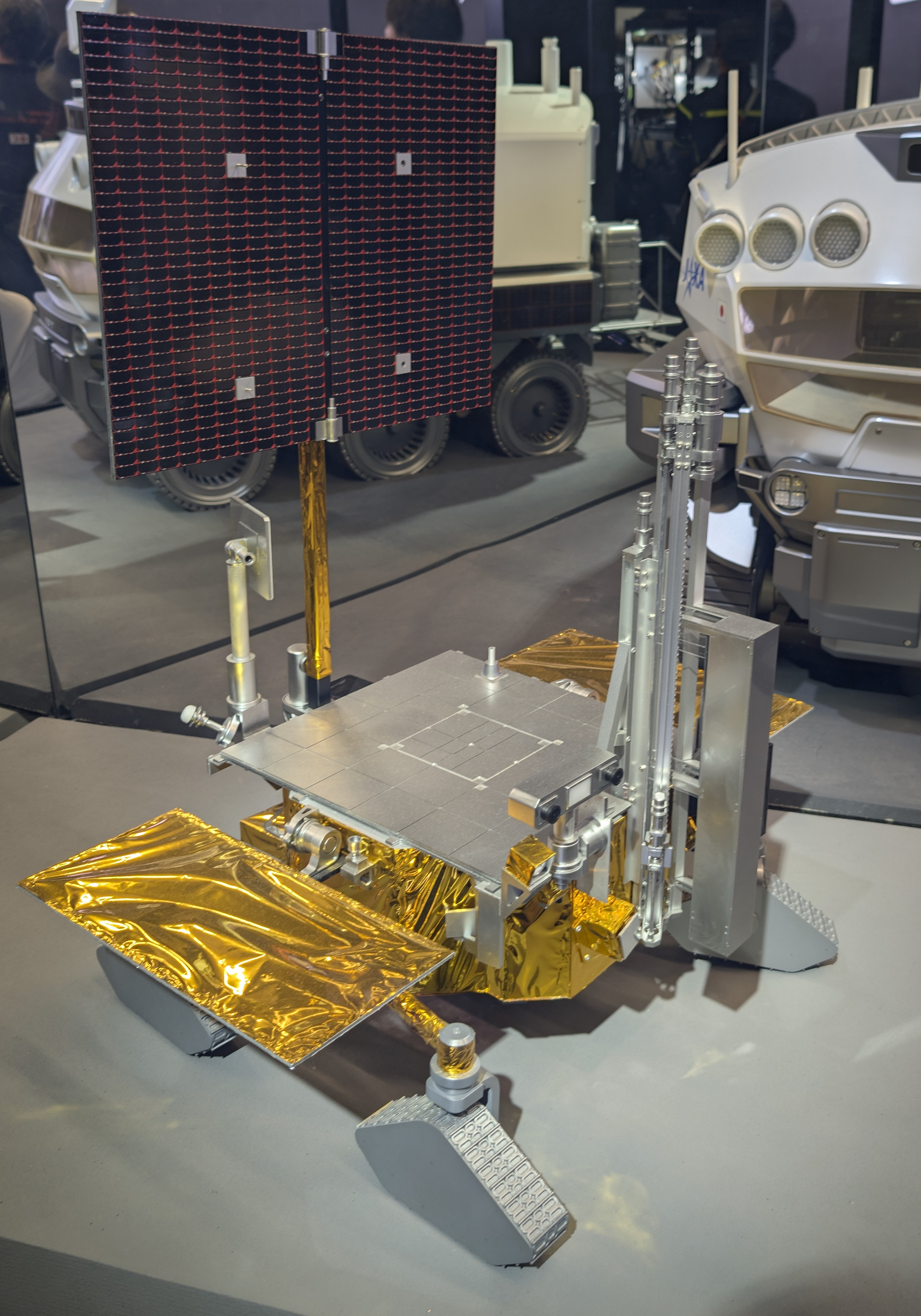
- Scale model (1/4) of LUPEX at JAXA pavilion at Expo 2025
- Mission type: Lander; Rover
- Operator: ISRO (India); JAXA (Japan)
- Website: www.exploration.jaxa.jp/e/program/lunarpolar/
- Mission duration: 3.5 months after landing (maximum one year)

Spacecraft properties
- Manufacturer: Launch vehicle and rover: Mitsubishi Heavy Industries; Lander: ISRO
- Launch mass: 6,650 kg (14,660 lb)
- Payload mass: 420 kg (930 lb) (lander with rover)
- Power: Watts

Start of mission
- Launch date: 2028–2029 (planned)
- Rocket: H3-24
- Launch site: Tanegashima, LA-Y
- Contractor: Mitsubishi Heavy Industries

Moon lander
- Spacecraft component: Rover
- Landing site: South polar region

Moon rover

The Lunar Polar Exploration Mission (LUPEX) (also called Chandrayaan-5) is a planned joint lunar mission by ISRO and JAXA. The mission would send an uncrewed lunar lander and rover to explore the south pole region of the Moon no earlier than 2028. It is envisaged to explore the permanently shadowed regions and to determine the quantity and quality of water on the Moon. JAXA will provide the H3 launch vehicle, 350 kg lunar rover along with instruments and ISRO will provide the lander and few rover instruments.

LUPEX will follow the planned lunar sample-return mission Chandrayaan-4.

== History ==
=== Preliminary development ===
ISRO signed an Implementation Arrangement (IA) in December 2017 for pre-phase A, phase A study and completed the feasibility report in March 2018 with JAXA to explore the polar regions of Moon for water with a joint Lunar Polar Exploration Mission (LUPEX) that would be launched no earlier than 2028.

ISRO and JAXA held the Joint Mission Definition Review (JMDR) in December 2018. By the end of 2019, JAXA concluded its internal Project Readiness Review.In a joint statement by JAXA and NASA on 24 September 2019, the possibility of NASA joining the LUPEX mission was discussed.

Since the Indian Chandrayaan-2 lunar mission's lander crashed on the Moon during its landing attempt in September 2019, India started to study a new lunar mission named Chandrayaan-3 as a repeat attempt to demonstrate the landing capabilities needed for the LUPEX. Chandrayaan-3 would successfully land near the south pole of the moon in August 2023.

JAXA finished its domestic System Requirement Review (SRR) in early 2021. In April 2023, LUPEX Working Group 1 arrived in India to share information of landing site analysis on promised candidate sites, methods of estimating lander and rover position on moon, information of ground antennas for command and telemetry. The Indian union cabinet also gave approval for the mission on 14 March 2025.

=== Development ===
India's Space Commission authorised ISRO to begin work on the LUPEX mission in late 2024. As of February 2025, teams were working on hardware design and development after the project was approved and the configuration study concluded. ISRO also started developmental work for a heavier lander engine.Following the Third Technical Interface Meeting between ISRO and JAXA in May 2025, it was confirmed that the launch vehicle was an H3-24L, and Mitsubishi Heavy Industries would manufacture the rover.

In August 2025, India and Japan signed the implementing arrangement for joint Lunar Polar Exploration (LuPEx) mission at the Fourth Technical Interface Meeting. The mission concept has been planned to last well over 100 days on the moon.The rover is undergoing a redesign as it has been found to be over weight. It will not incorporate RHU's but will have a special insulating mechanism to prevent heat loss during the lunar night. Another delegation visited India in November 2025 to develop an updated concept of operations, which was finalised with an updated timeline for operations that December, at the Fifth technical meeting in Japan, which involved representatives from MHI. New interfaces were to be developed or both lander-rover compatibility and lander-launch vehicle compatibility.

During the publication of ISRO's annual report for 2025-26, ISRO revealed that a prototype L9 engine, a 3.1kn liquid-fuel engine that would be used on the LuPEx lander and been hot-fired earlier that year. An ISRO delegation visited Tanegashima Space Centre in preparations for development activity in April 2026.

== Overview ==
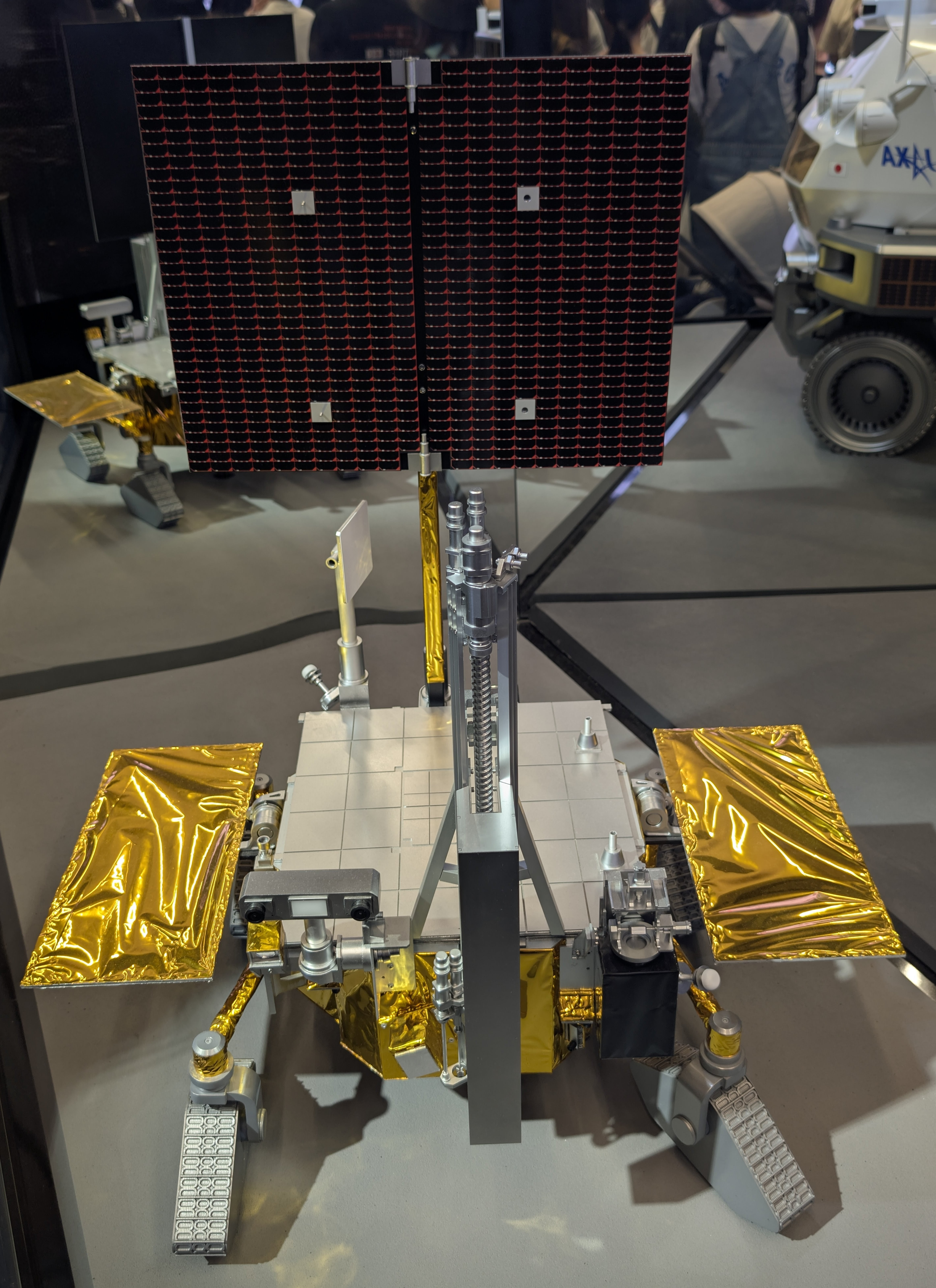
Scale model (1/4) of LUPEX at JAXA pavilion at Expo 2025

The Lunar Polar Exploration mission would demonstrate new surface exploration technologies related to vehicular transport and lunar night survival for sustainable lunar exploration in polar regions. For precision landing it would utilize a feature matching algorithm and navigational equipment derived from JAXA's Smart Lander for Investigating Moon (SLIM) mission. The lander's payload capacity would be 420 kg (930 lb) at minimum. The rover would carry multiple instruments by JAXA and ISRO including a drill to collect sub-surface samples from 1.5 m (4 ft 11 in) depth. Water prospecting and analysis are also likely to be mission objectives. The missions overall goal will be to study the lunar volatile materials, including lunar water, in the vicinity of a Permanently Shadowed Region at the lunar South pole.The mission is expected to last over 100 days at the moon.

The European Space Agency's Exospheric Mass Spectrometer L-band (EMS-L) of PROSPECT mission was originally planned to fly as a payload on the Russian Luna 27 mission, however EMS-L will now fly on this mission due to continued international collaboration being thrown into doubt by the 2022 Russian invasion of Ukraine and related sanctions on Russia. Payload proposals from other space agencies might be sought.

The lander has been fully re-engineered by ISRO, which required the development of a new engine. The same engine will be used by ISRO in the future for crewed lunar landing missions. The LUPEX mission will test this engine, developed by Liquid Propulsion Systems Centre (LPSC). The rover now weighs 350 kg, while the lander is heavier (in comparison to the original design). The rover is mounted externally as it is heavy and cannot be transported within the lander like in Chandrayaan-3. A sky crane like arrangement has now been designed to deploy it on the Moon's surface.

One of the main challenges ahead is choosing a specific landing location, according to Inoue Hiroka, a researcher with the Lunar Polar Exploration Project Team at JAXA's Space Exploration Center. Landing at the south polar zone of the Moon is the plan, as it is thought to have a high probability of having water. There aren't many level places in this area, though, that are perfect for landing and guaranteeing adequate lighting and communication. The team intends to make its landing site public as soon as they determine the ideal place, since other nations may select the same area.

== Payloads ==
Some selected Japanese instruments along with the candidate instruments of ISRO and ESA and the invited international collaborators by JAXA.

- REsource Investigation Water Analyzer (REIWA): Instrument package of the four instruments.
  - Lunar ThermoGravimetric Analyzer (LTGA): Thermogravimetric analyses of the drilled samples for water content.(JAXA)
  - TRIple-reflection reflecTrON (TRITON): Identification of chemical species of the volatile component in the drilled samples based on mass spectrometry. (JAXA)
  - Aquatic Detector using Optical REsonance (ADORE): Water content measurement in the drilled samples based on cavity ring-down spectrometry.(JAXA)
  - ISRO Sample Analysis Package (ISAP): Mineralogical and elemental measurement of the drilled samples. (ISRO)
- Permittivity and Thermo-physical Investigation for Moon's Aquatic Scout (PRATHIMA): For in-situ detection and quantification of water-ice mixed with lunar regolith. The payload consists of a multipurpose probe that will be deployed into ~20-30 cm of the lunar surface to scout and quantify the presence of water-ice. (PRL/ISRO)
- Water Scouting Surface Penetrating Radar (WaSSPeR): Underground radar observation up to 1.5 meters during rover traverse. (ISRO)
- Mid-IR spectrometer (MIR): To detect water and OH signature on the surface. (ISRO)
- Advanced Lunar Imaging Spectrometer (ALIS): Near-infrared imaging spectrometer for H_{2}O/OH observation of the surface and drilled regolith.(JAXA)
- Neutron Spectrometer (NS): Underground neutron (hydrogen) observation up to one meter during rover traverse. (NASA)
- Exploration Mass Spectrometer for LUPEX (EMS-L): Surface gas pressure, chemical species and surface temperature measurement instrument. It is a significantly improved derivative of ESA's Exospheric Mass Spectrometer (EMS) that was flown successfully as the core of the NASA/ESA PITMS instrument on the Astrobotic M1 mission. Core elements of the EMS-L instrument are also flown on ESA's PROSPECT payload which was originally foreseen to launch on Luna 27, but was changed to Intuitive Machine's Nova-C lander following the Russian Invasion of Ukraine . (ESA)

== See also ==
- Chandrayaan Programme
- In-situ resource utilization
- Lunar resources
- Lunar water
- VIPER rover
- Luna 27
- Chang'e 6
- HERACLES
