= Space Applications Centre =

Indian research institution

Coordinates: 23.025°N 72.517°E

- Inscription at gate

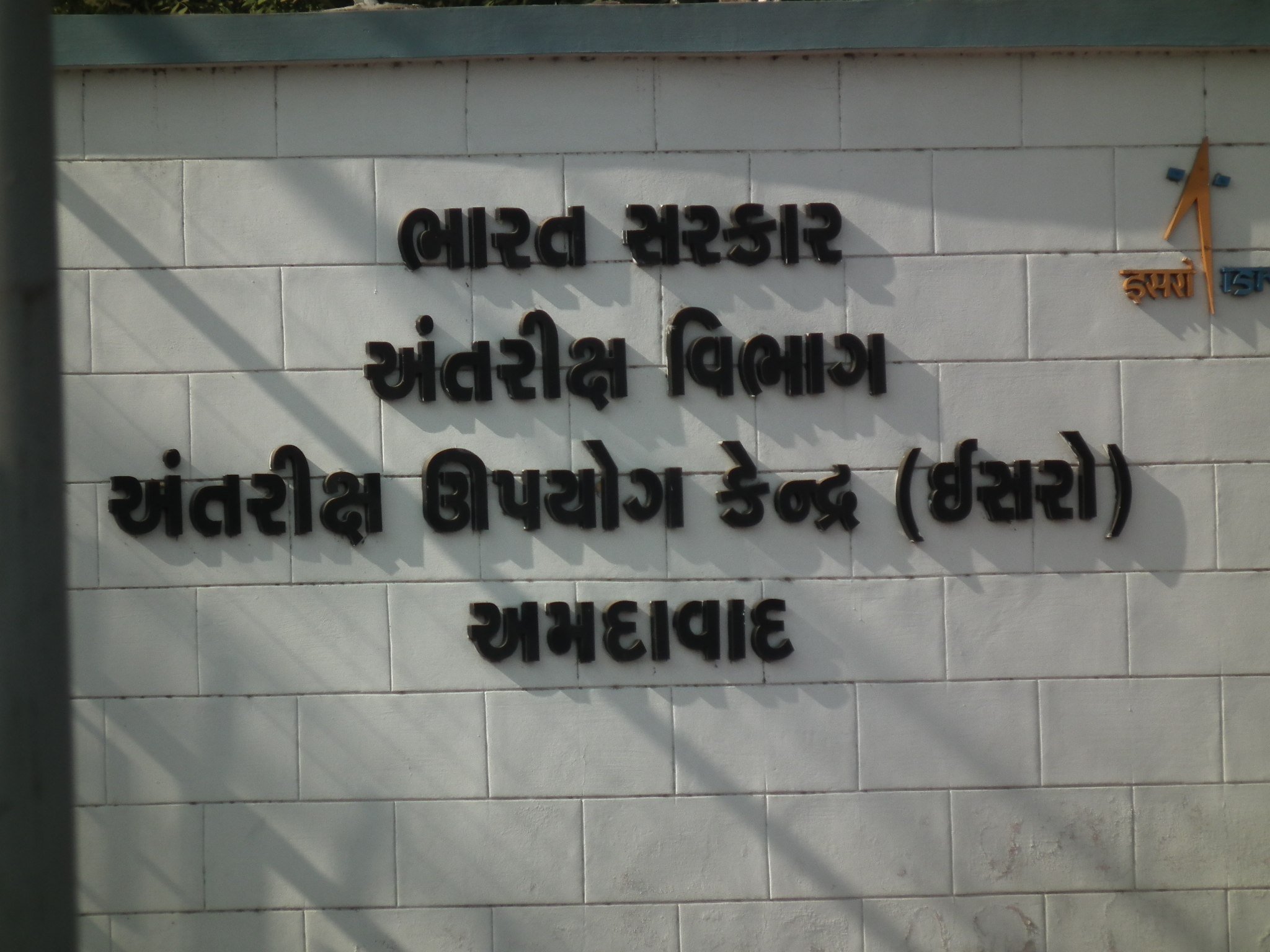
- SAC logo

Agency overview
- Abbreviation: SAC
- Formed: 25 October 1972
- Type: Space agency
- Headquarters: Ahmedabad, Gujarat
- Administrator: Nilesh M Desai (Director)
- Website: https://www.sac.gov.in

Space Applications Centre (SAC) is an institution of research in Ahmedabad under the aegis of ISRO. It is one of the major centres of ISRO that is engaged in the research, development and demonstration of applications of space technology in the field of telecommunications, remote sensing, meteorology and satellite navigation (Sat Nav). This includes research and development of on-board systems, ground systems and end user equipment hardware and software. SAC has three campuses, two of which are located at Ahmedabad and one at Delhi. The current director of the centre is Nilesh M Desai.

== Achievements ==
Some of the achievements of the Space Applications Centre include development of communication and meteorological payloads for INSAT satellites, optical and microwave payloads for IRS satellites. SAC provides its infrastructure to conduct training courses to the students of the Center for Space Science and Technology Education in Asia and The Pacific (CSSTEAP). It was founded by Dr. Vikram Sarabhai.

On 19 March 2021, SAC in a major breakthrough demonstrated free space quantum communication technology at a distance of 300 meters between two buildings through live video conferencing as part of Quantum Experiments using Satellite Technology (QuEST) project. The primary objective is to successfully perform satellite based quantum communication between two ISRO ground station. Hardware developed for performing the experiment includes NavIC receiver for time synchronization between transmitter and receiver, gimbal mechanism systems as an alternative to large aperture telescope for optical alignment.

Collaborations between SAC Ahmedabad and National Institute of Design, Gujarat began in the early 1970s.

== Commercialization ==
A memorandum of understanding was signed on 30 September 2024, between Bharat Electronics and the Space Applications Centre, pertaining to collaboration, indigenization, and infrastructure development for the production of space-grade travelling wave tube amplifiers.
