= Chandrayaan programme =

Indian Lunar exploration programme

- Candrayāna Abhiyāna
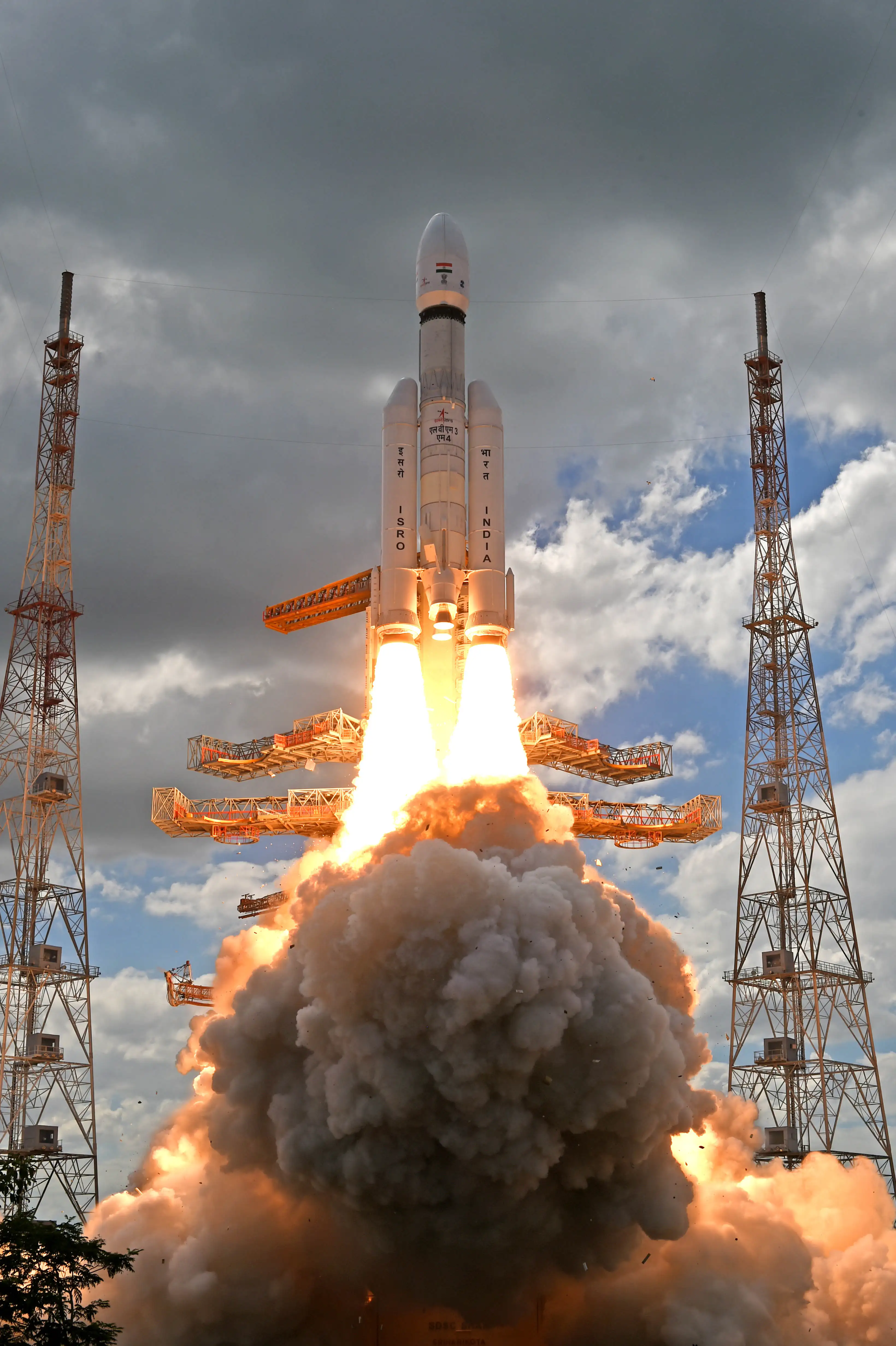
- LVM3 M4 lifting off with Chandrayaan-3 on 14 July 2023

Program overview
- Country: India
- Organisation: ISRO
- Purpose: Exploration of the Moon
- Status: Active

Programme history
- Cost: ₹1,980 crore (US$210 million)
- Duration: 2003–present
- First flight: Chandrayaan-1, 22 October 2008; 18 years ago
- Last flight: Chandrayaan-3, 14 July 2023; 3 years ago
- Successes: 2
- Failures: 0
- Partial failures: 1 (Chandrayaan-2)
- Launch site: Satish Dhawan Space Centre

Vehicle information
- Uncrewed vehicles: Chandrayaan orbiters; Vikram; Pragyan
- Launch vehicles: PSLV; LVM3; LMLV

The Chandrayaan programme (/ˌtʃʌndrəˈjɑːn/ CHUN-drə-YAHN) (Sanskrit: Candra 'Moon', Yāna 'Craft, Vehicle',) is an ongoing series of outer space missions by ISRO for the exploration of the Moon. The program incorporates a lunar orbiter, an impactor, a lunar lander and a rover spacecraft.

There have been three missions so far with a total of two orbiters, landers and rovers each. While the two orbiters were successful, the first lander and rover which were part of the Chandrayaan-2 mission, crashed on the surface. The second lander and rover mission Chandrayaan-3 successfully landed on the Moon on 23 August 2023, making India the first nation to successfully land a spacecraft in the lunar south pole region, and the fourth country to land on the Moon after the Soviet Union, the United States and China.

== Background ==
The Indian space programme had begun with no intentions of undertaking sophisticated initiatives like human spaceflight and extraterrestrial missions during the initial days. It was only after ISRO developed the capabilities of creating satellites and orbital launch vehicles like PSLV, that the possibilities of India's first extraterrestrial exploration mission to the Moon were being explored in the early 2000s. The idea of a lunar scientific mission was first raised in 1999 during a meeting of the Indian Academy of Sciences (IAS) which was then carried forward by the Astronautical Society of India (ASI) in 2000. The robotic exploration programme is intended as a precursor until Indian astronauts land on the Moon to carry forward further explorations, with the robotic programme planned to continue beyond crewed landings as a support to the crewed missions.

== History ==
=== First mission ===
Soon after the proposals by the Indian Academy of Sciences in 1999 and by the Astronautical Society of India in 2000, a National Lunar Mission Task Force (NLMTF) was set up which constituted ISRO and leading Indian scientists and technologists across the nation to conduct the feasibility study. The study report was then reviewed by a peer group of 100 scientists from various fields. The recommendations put forward were as follows:

- The Indian Moon Mission assumes significance in the context of the international scientific community considering several exciting missions in planetary exploration, in the new millennium.
- ISRO has the necessary expertise to develop and launch the Moon Mission with imaginative features and it would be different from the past missions. Hence ISRO should go ahead with the project approval and implementation.
- Apart from technological and scientific gains, it would provide the needed thrust to basic science and engineering research in the country. The project would help return young talents to the arena of fundamental research.
- The Academia, in particular, the university scientists would find participation in such a project intellectually rewarding. In this context, the scientific objectives would need further refinement to include other innovative ideas from a broader scientific community through Announcement of Opportunity, etc.

It is not whether we can afford it. It is whether we can afford to ignore it.

— Krishnaswamy Kasturirangan, ISRO Chairman on the Chandrayaan-1 mission, BBC

On 15 August 2003, then prime minister Atal Bihari Vajpayee announced the project which was estimated to cost ₹350 crore (US$37 million). In November of the same year, the government approved the Chandrayaan project which would consist of an orbiter that would conduct mineralogical and chemical mapping of the surface. During the assembly of the orbiter only mission, then president A. P. J. Abdul Kalam visited the ISRO office and advised that orbiter alone would not suffice and proposed of another instrument that could be dropped on the surface. Following the advice, the scientists made design changes to the project and included an impact probe named Moon Impact Probe (MIP). The MIP was planned to be dropped from 100 km (62 mi) altitude and would acquire close-range images of the surface, collect telemetry data for future soft landing missions and measure the constituents of the lunar atmosphere.

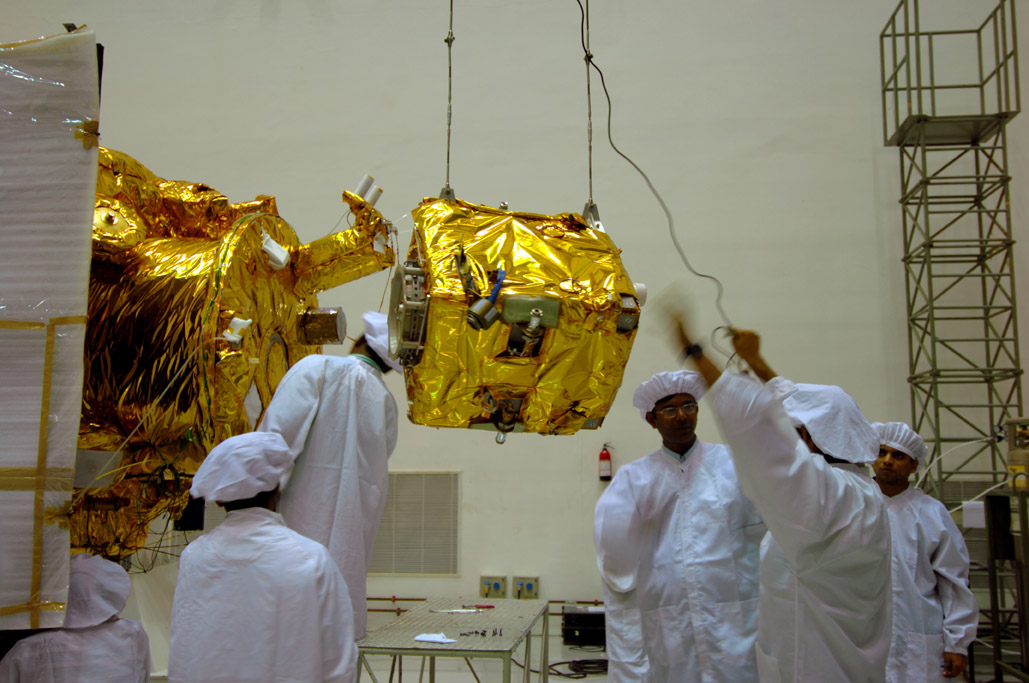
Moon Impact Probe being integrated with Chandrayaan-1.

The project required India set up its deep space network and the entire project cost ₹360 crore (US$38 million). On 22 October 2008, Chandrayaan-1 was successfully launched aboard the PSLV rocket. After earth bound maneuvers and trans lunar injection, Chandrayaan-1 entered the lunar orbit on 10 November, making India the fifth nation to orbit Moon. Four days later, on 14 November, the Moon Impact Probe (MIP) impacted near the Shackleton crater, in the lunar south pole, this made India the fifth country to reach the lunar surface. The MIP made the most significant discovery by confirming the existence of water on Moon. This discovery was not made public until NASA's Moon Mineralogy Mapper payload onboard Chandrayaan-1 orbiter confirmed the same on 24 September 2009. The mission was intended to last two years, but the contact with the orbiter was lost on 28 August 2009, which officially ended the mission.

=== Second mission ===
After the success of the Chandrayaan-1 mission, a follow-up mission worth ₹425 crore (US$45 million) was already being planned and was targeted for a launch in 2012. Abdul Kalam suggested for collaboration between India and the United States for the Chandrayaan-2 mission, which would soft land near the lunar south pole and perform robotic penetrations into the surface to study more about the lunar water. However, an agreement had already been signed in the year 2007 by ISRO and Roscosmos, the Russian federal space agency, for the second lunar mission under the Chandrayaan-2 project.

==== Russian collaboration and back out ====
According to the agreement, ISRO had the responsibility of launching, orbiting, and deployment of the Pragyan rover while Russia's Roscosmos would provide the lander. The design of the spacecraft by ISRO was completed in 2009, the payloads were also finalized and the launch was targeted for 2013. The project then hit a roadblock when Russia delayed its development of the lander due to failure of its Fobos-Grunt mission which revealed technical issues in the similar parts that would be used in the lunar lander. Russia then proposed a few changes which required ISRO to decrease mass of its rover due to increase in the mass of the lander. A delayed timeline and the Russian request to accept the risk meant that India had to undertake the entire project independently. With Mars transfer window arriving in the 2013, ISRO repurposed the unused Chandrayaan-2 orbiter hardware for the Mars Orbiter Mission.

==== Indigenous development of the lander ====
With the Russian agreement falling apart, India was left alone and now had complete responsibility for the project including the development of lander technology. For which, ISRO created a mimic of Chandrayaan-2's lunar landing site in Challakere with craters that measured 10 m (33 ft) in diameter and were 3 m (9.8 ft) deep. This site was used for testing the electronics of the lander and rover. The project was now estimated to cost ₹600 crore (US$64 million) and was expected to launch in the first quarter of 2018 on GSLV MK-II. Later in 2017, India signed a deal with Japan's JAXA to conduct a feasibility study for another joint lunar roving mission named Lunar Polar Exploration Mission (LUPEX). For which a technical demonstration of soft landing was required to be conducted with Chandrayaan-2 mission.

Artificial craters created by ISRO in Doddallurathi, Challakere, Karnataka to mimic lunar surface.

In 2018, the mission faced its second delay after ISRO made design changes for the spacecraft as well as changes in its maneuver where the lander would orbit the Moon to assess the performance of various systems before performing landing. This was contrary to the previous plan where the lander would directly descend after arriving in the designated orbit. A fifth engine was added to the lander, the diameter of the landing legs was increased, two additional propellant tanks were added and additional support systems for power, structure, and thermal control were also provided. This significantly increased the mass of the composite and required ISRO to upgrade the GSLV Mk-II vehicle, but the scientists felt it would be risky to fly the test flight of the uprated Mk-II with Chandrayaan-2 payload, hence a more capable and already flown LVM3 vehicle was chosen.

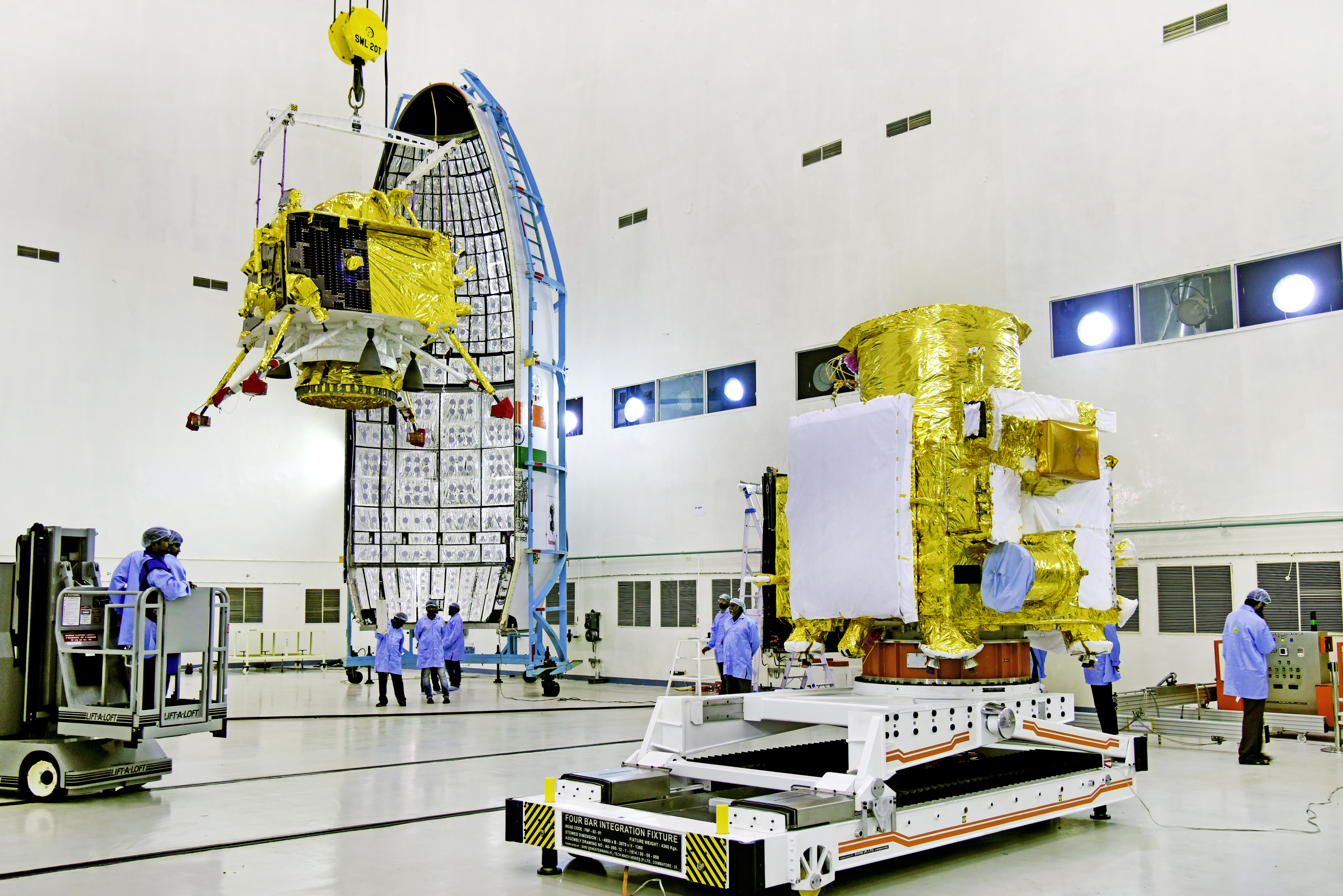
Vikram lander of Chandrayaan-2 being hoisted

During a landing test in February 2019, the lander suffered minor injuries in two of its legs due to a faulty orientation for the test, and the launch was then targeted for the second quarter of the year. Final cost for the Chandrayaan-2 project was around ₹800 crore (US$85 million).

==== Flight ====
On 22 July 2019, Chandrayaan-2 was finally launched on LVM3 putting an end to several roadblocks that hit the mission during the decade. After orbit-raising maneuvers and finally the trans lunar injection, Chandrayaan-2 attained the lunar Orbit on 20 August. On 6 September 2019, during the descent to the surface, the contact with the lander was lost after it crash-landed. According to the chairman K. Sivan, the lander was operating as expected until it was just 2.1 km (1.3 mi) above the surface when it started deviating from the intended trajectory. Four years later, ISRO chairman S. Somanath revealed three major reasons for the failure, the presence of five engines that generated a higher thrust which made the errors accumulate over time, the lander being unable to turn very fast because it was not expected to perform at such a high pace turning and the final reason was the small 500x500 m landing site chosen that left the lander with less room for error.

Before and after images of the impact site of the Chandrayaan-2

=== Third mission ===
==== Development ====
Two months after the failure of Chandrayaan-2, the third mission was proposed with the lander and rover being the primary components of the mission, unlike previously where the orbiter carried a greater scientific payload. The Chandrayaan-3 would be a re-attempt to demonstrate the landing capabilities needed for the LUPEX mission, a proposed partnership with Japan that was planned for 2025-26 time frame. ISRO sought ₹75 crore (US$8.0 million) from the government as initial funding for the Chandrayaan-3 project that included a propulsion module, a lander, and a rover. It was expected to launch a year later in November 2020. On 19 December 2019, P Veeramuthuvel was appointed as the director of the mission. The work on the project was underway come January 2020 and K. Sivan revealed that the launch may happen in early 2021 with the total cost of the project being ₹615 crore (US$66 million). Later in March, the government confirmed that the launch could take place in the first half of 2021. The earlier addition of the fifth engine in the Chandrayaan-2's lander that caused the additional thrust was now removed from the design of Chandrayaan-3. Like Chandrayaan-2, the testing for the lander was to be conducted in Challakere where ISRO's previously built Moon like site with craters had deteriorated. A total of ₹24.2 lakh (US$26,000) was spent on recreating the site with craters of similar dimensions (10 m (33 ft) wide and 3 m (9.8 ft) deep).

The launch which was planned for early 2021, was then delayed to 2022 due to COVID-19 pandemic in India. The propulsion module which was ready before the pandemic had begun its testing, following which the lander and rover tests were to be conducted but the pandemic delayed the project and pushed its tentative launch date to the third quarter of 2022. Few more changes with strengthening the landing legs, improvisation in instruments, a failure-proof configuration and additional testing meant that the new schedule for the launch was moved to second quarter of 2023.

In May 2023, the spacecraft was in its final stage of the assembly of payloads at the U. R. Rao Satellite Centre with the launch targeted for the first or second week of July.

==== Successful soft landing ====
On 14 July 2023, Chandrayaan-3 was successfully launched on LVM3 and was inserted in the lunar sphere of gravitational influence on 5 August 2023. On 23 August 2023, the lander Vikram successfully soft landed in the lunar south pole region, achieving humanity's first soft landing in the region and making India the fourth country to soft land on the Moon after the Soviet Union, the United States and China. Soon after the touchdown, the rover Pragyan got down off the ramp and drove 8 m (26 ft) making India only the third country to operate a robotic rover on the Moon after the Soviet Union and China.

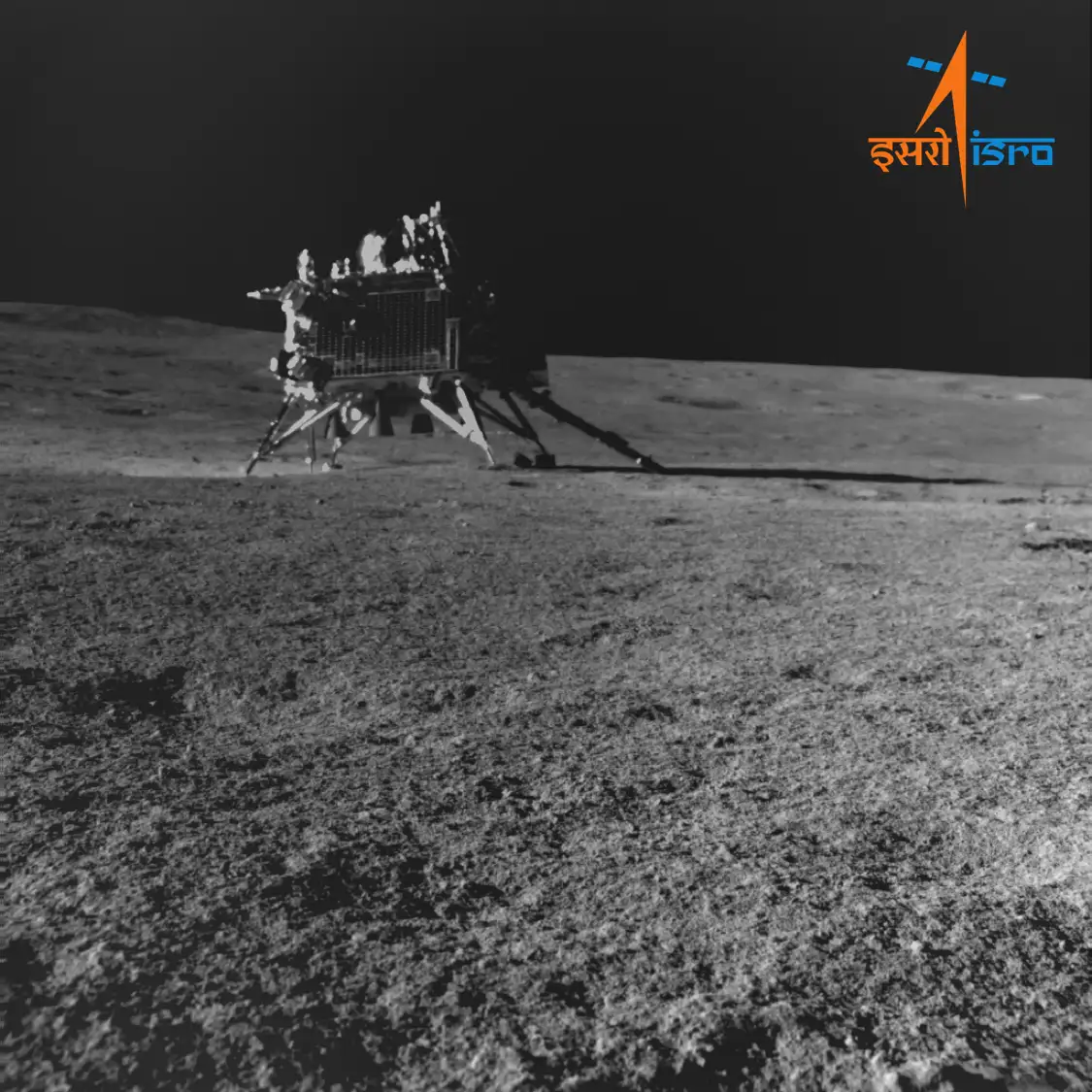
Chandrayaan-3's lander Vikram on the Moon as seen by the Pragyan rover.

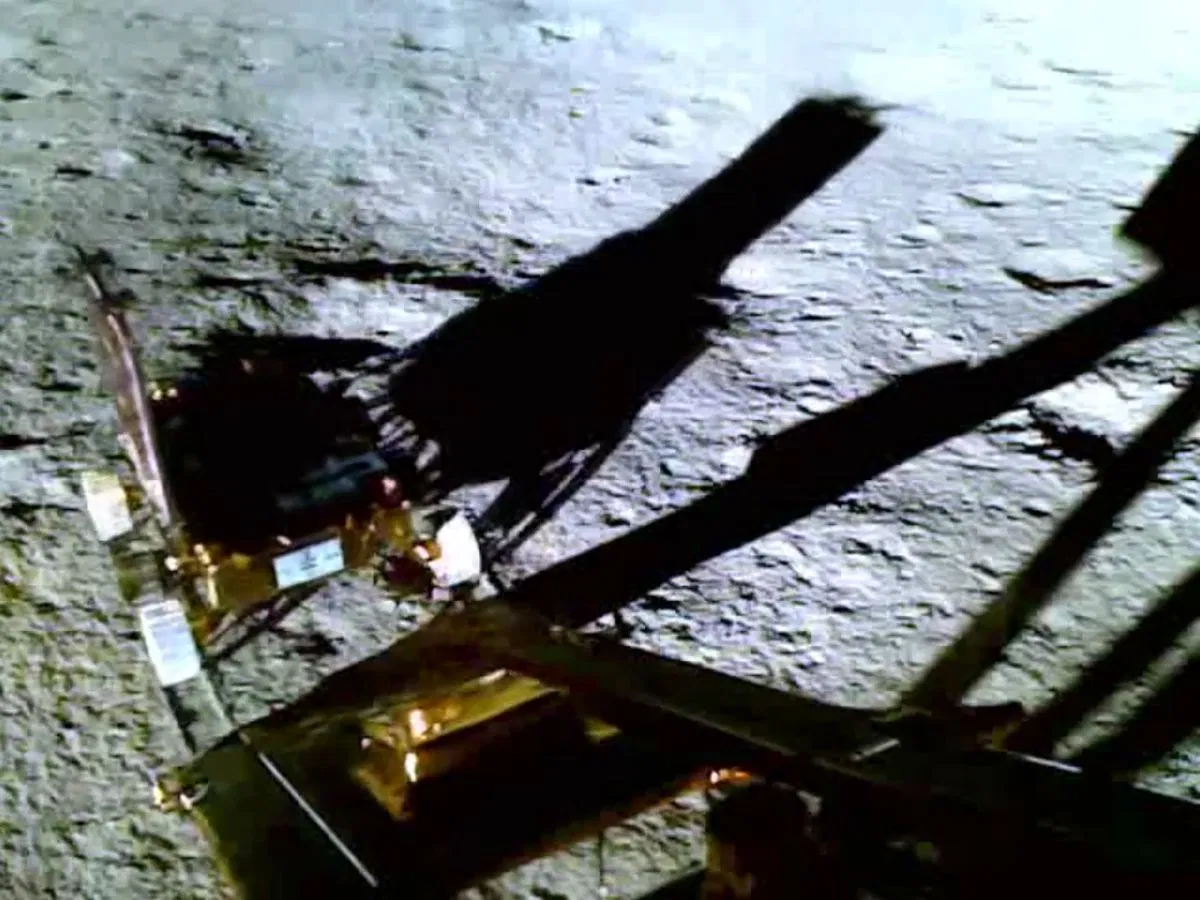
Pragyan rover roll out.

== Spacecraft ==
The Chandrayaan programme consists of robotic explorers such as: the Moon Impact Probe, an impactor; Chandrayaan-1 and 2, the orbiters; the Vikram lander; and the Pragyaan rover.

=== Impactor: Moon Impact Probe ===
The Moon Impact Probe (MIP) weighed 35 kg (77 lb) with 25 minutes of expected operating duration. It carried a Radar altimeter to record the altitude data which would be used in qualifying technologies for future soft landing missions, a Video imaging system to acquire close-range pictures of the lunar surface, and a Mass spectrometer to study the tenuous atmosphere of the Moon. On 12 November 2008, the MIP separated from the orbiter and impacted near the lunar south pole's Shackleton crater. While descending, the probe's Chandra's Altitudinal Composition Explorer (CHACE) instrument detected the presence of water.

=== Orbiters ===
==== Chandrayaan-1 ====
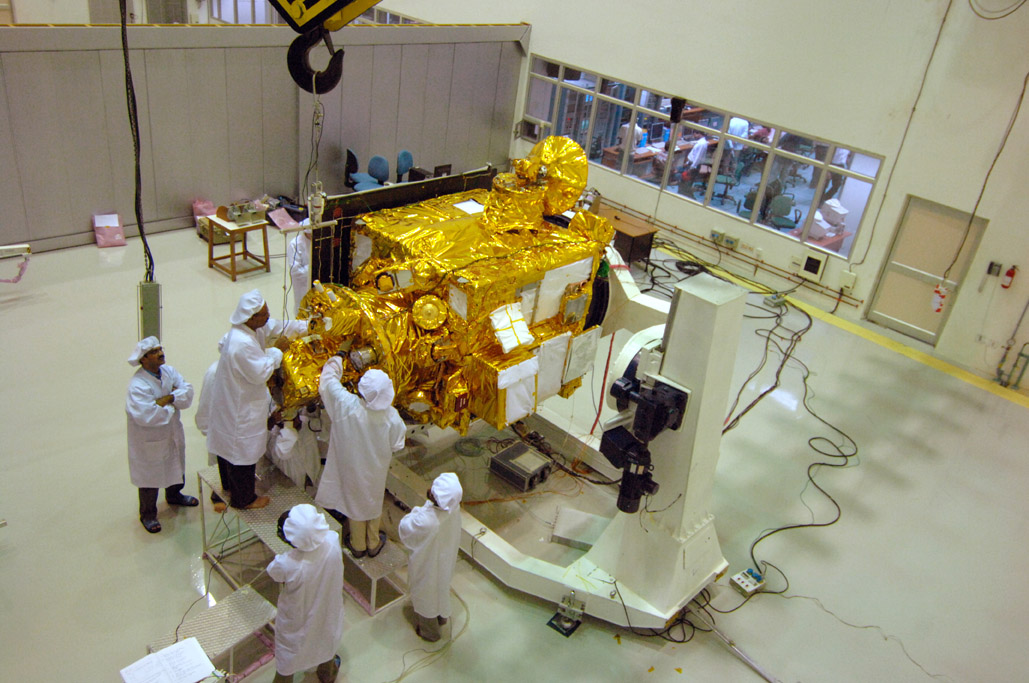
Chandrayaan-1 orbiter undergoing pre-launch tests

Chandrayaan-1 launched on 22 October 2008 aboard PSLV-XL was a solar-powered cuboid orbiter that weighed 1,380 kg (3,042 lb) along with the Moon Impact Probe. It was powered by a single-sided solar array during the day and supported by lithium-ion batteries at night. The attitude of the spacecraft was controlled by three-axis stabilization method using two star sensors, gyroscopes and four reaction wheels. The scientific data transmission was conducted in X band frequencies while telemetry tracking was done in S band frequencies. To store these data, two solid-state recorders (SSR) were used with SSR-1 carrying 32 GB dedicated capacity for scientific data while SSR-2 carrying 8 GB capacity for the rest of the scientific data and attitude information. Moon Mineralogy Mapper, an American scientific payload onboard carried its own SSR with 10 GB capacity.

The orbiter-impactor composite entered the lunar sphere of gravitational influence on 8 November 2008. After orbital reduction manoeuvres, it attained an elliptical polar orbit of 100 km (62 mi), upon which, two of the eleven scientific payloads, the Terrain Mapping Camera (TMC) which had a spatial resolution of 5 m (16 ft) and Radiation Dose Monitor (RADOM) were switched on for operations. Post deployment of MIP, rest of the nine scientific instruments began operations.

On 25 November 2008, just a couple of weeks after entering lunar orbit, the orbiter's temperature rose to 50 °C (122 °F) after receiving equal amounts of heat from the sun as well as the moon (due to its Albedo). Efforts such as rotating the craft by 20 degrees, shutting down the mission computers, and increasing its orbit to 200 km (120 mi) were made to bring its temperature down and to avoid damaging the onboard instruments. A year later, the overheating problem was responsible for ending the mission as it damaged the star sensors which maintained the orientation of craft. The orientation was then barely maintained with the help of gyroscopes as a temporary measure before losing contact on 28 August 2009, which ended the mission a year before its intended duration. However, the mission was analyzed to be 95% successful with its intended operations.

==== Chandrayaan-2 ====
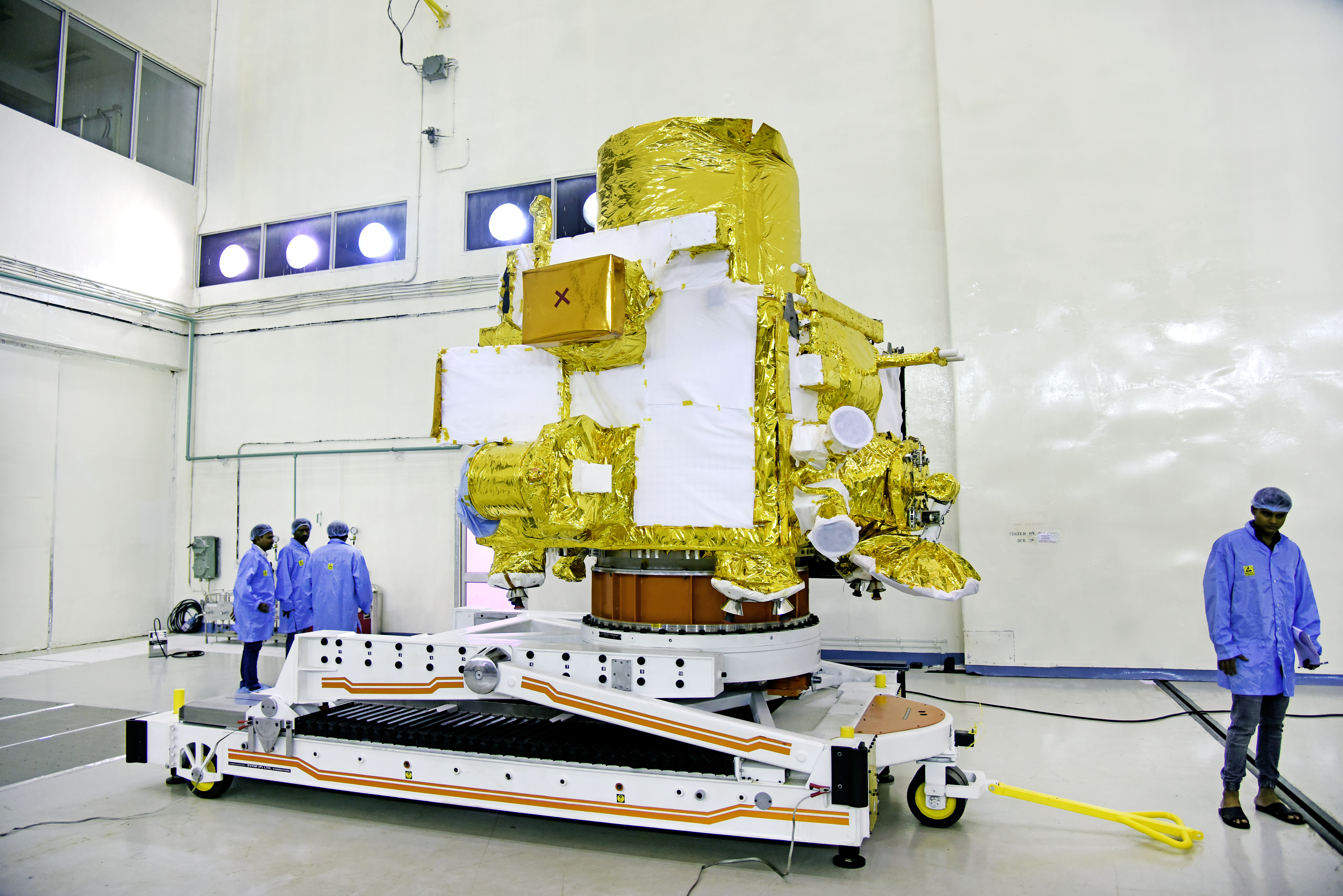
Chandrayaan-2 Orbiter

Chandrayaan-2 was the second mission under the programme and it included an orbiter, lander, and rover. After the failure of the Chandrayaan-1 orbiter, the Chandrayaan-2 orbiter enabled ISRO to conduct science with modern cameras and instruments. The primary objectives of this mission were to soft land on the surface and operate a rover, to study the lunar surface, its exosphere, minerals and water ice. While the Chandrayaan-2 composite (orbiter, lander and rover) weighed 3,850 kg (8,490 lb) in total, the orbiter alone weighed 2,379 kg (5,245 lb). It carried eight scientific instruments with two of the instruments; the Terrain Mapping Camera 2 (TMC-2) and Chandrayaan-2 Atmospheric Compositional Explorer 2 (ChACE-2) being upgraded versions of Terrain Mapping camera (TMC) and Chandra's Atmospheric Compositional Explorer (CHACE) onboard Chandrayaan-1 orbiter and Moon Impact Probe respectively.

The Chandrayaan-2 was launched on 14 July 2019 and attained the lunar orbit on 20 August 2019. After five orbital reduction manoeuvres, the composite attained a near circular orbit of 127 km × 119 km (79 mi × 74 mi), which was followed by the separation of Vikram on 2 September 2019. The crash landing of Vikram left the orbiter as a sole successful component of the mission with its new mission duration being extended from one year to seven and a half years. The Orbiter High-Resolution Camera (OHRC) during the time remained the most advanced camera in the lunar orbit with a spatial resolution of 25 cm (9.8 in), four times higher than Chandrayaan-1 orbiter's 1 m (3 ft 3 in) resolution. The orbiter is currently studying the lava tubes and caves which were previously spotted by the Chandrayaan-1 orbiter.

==== Chandrayaan-3 ====
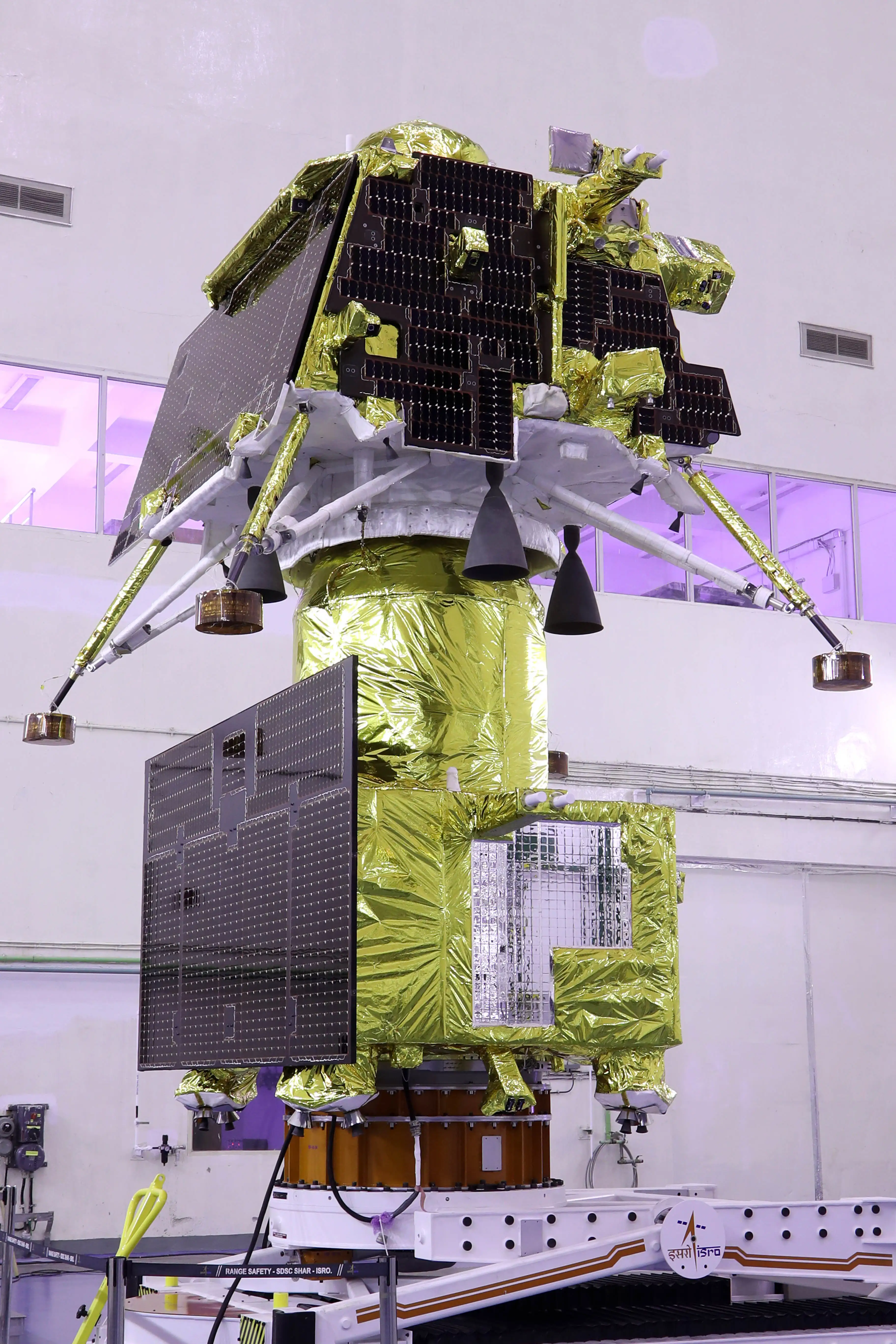
Chandrayaan-3 Integrated Module

With the Chandrayaan-2 orbiter already operational and the need of demonstrating landing capabilities, Chandraayn-3's orbiter carried only a single payload and for its main purpose served as a propulsion module for carrying Vikram to the Moon. The Spectro-polarimetry of Habitable Planet Earth (SHAPE) payload was developed to study Earth's atmosphere from distance and it would aid in the study of Exoplanets' atmospheres, which employs a similar technique. Chandrayaan-3 was launched on 14 July 2023 aboard LVM3 and on 16 August 2023, the composite attained a final lunar orbit of 113 km × 157 km (70 mi × 98 mi). A day later, the orbiter separated from the lander and began its independent operations with SHAPE. The orbiter also known as Propulsion Module (PM) of Chandrayaan-3, was moved from its orbit around Moon to an orbit around Earth. While the initial plan was to operate SHAPE for about three months during the mission life of orbiter, the precise lower earth orbit injection by LVM3 and optimal earth / lunar burn maneuvers, resulted in the availability of over 100 kg (220 lb) of fuel in the orbiter after over one month of operations in the lunar orbit. It was decided to use the available fuel in it to derive additional information for future lunar missions and demonstrate the mission operation strategies for a sample return mission. In order to continue SHAPE payload for Earth observation, it was decided to re-orbit the orbiter to a suitable Earth orbit. This mission plan was worked out considering the collision avoidance such as preventing the orbiter from crashing on to the Moon's surface or entering into the Earth's GEO belt at 36000 km and orbits below that. Considering the estimated fuel availability and the safety to GEO spacecraft, the optimal Earth return trajectory was designed for October 2023. It operated until 22 August 2024.

=== Landers ===
==== Vikram (Chandrayaan-2) ====
The lander was named Vikram and it weighed 1,471 kg (3,243 lb) including the 27 kg (60 lb) rover named Pragyan that it housed inside. Vikram had eight 58 N (13 lb_{f}) thrusters for attitude control and five 800 N (180 lb_{f}) liquid main engines that were derived from ISRO's 400 N (90 lb_{f}) liquid apogee motors and it was designed to safely land on slopes up to 12°. It carried four payloads to study lunar seismic activity, measure the lunar sub-surface temperatures and to measure density and variation of lunar surface plasma (using a langmuir probe).

After two de-orbiting manoeuvers, Vikram attained a final orbit of 95 km × 119 km (59 mi × 74 mi) after which the powered descent phase began on 7 September 2019. During the descent and landing, the onboard computers had complete control over the lander. The initial descent and critical braking procedures went as intended but upon reaching 2.1 km (1.3 mi) altitude, the lander began deviating and lost its contact with the mission control after subsequent crash landing. Upon analysis, it was found that the main engines had higher thrust than normal which led to errors being accumulated over time and this meant the lander could not change its attitude at such a fast pace due to safety constraints in the onboard computer that had a limit on the maximum rate at which it could change its attitude. Coarse throttling of main engines, error in computing the remaining time in the mission, and a small landing site of 500 x 500 m were the other reasons attributed to the failure.

==== Vikram (Chandrayaan-3) ====
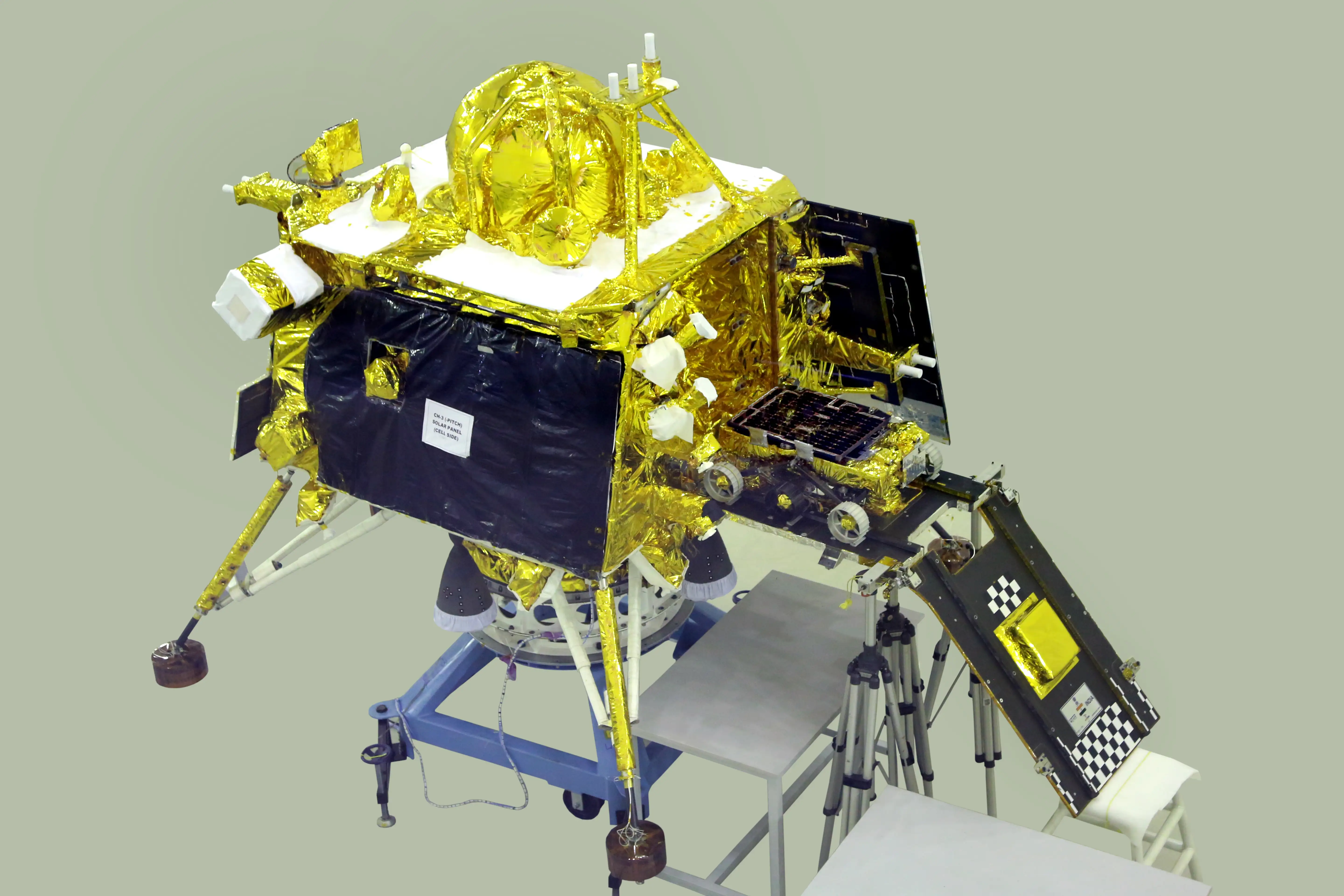
Chandrayaan-3's Vikram lander

Chandrayaan-3's Vikram lander had undergone major changes after its predecessor crash-landed. There were now four instead of five main engines that provided 800 N (180 lb_{f}) of thrust and had slew rate changing capabilities, unlike previously when the centrally mounted fifth engine lacked the capability. This enabled the lander to control the attitude and thrust during all phases of descent. The attitude correction rate was also increased from Chandrayaan-2's 10°/s to 25°/s with Chandrayaan-3. An additional laser doppler velocimeter (LDV) was equipped that allowed attitude measurements in all three directions. The impact legs were made larger and stronger than those of Chandrayaan-2. The OHRC onboard Chandrayaan-2 enabled the mission to have an expanded landing site with a 10 km^{2} (3.9 sq mi) landing area. The lander underwent several tests, including a helicopter drop test that helped improve the structural rigidity. In the event of a failure during descent and landing, multiple contingency systems were added to improve the survivability chances of the lander. The landing region was unchanged from the previous mission, with the area of the new site being expanded to 4 km × 2.5 km (2.5 mi × 1.6 mi) from the previous 500 m × 500 m (1,600 ft × 1,600 ft). Other major changes in the new 'failure-based' approach included the removal of the fifth engine, an increase in fuel capacity, an increase in vertical velocity component, and other software changes.

On 23 August 2023, the lander that had previously reduced its orbit to 25 km × 134 km (16 mi × 83 mi) via de-orbit burns, began descending using all four of its engines after it reached near its Periselene at 30 km (19 mi). Roughly after eleven minutes of powered descent, the lander maintained the altitude of 7.5 km (4.7 mi) for 10 seconds before changing its attitude to a vertical position for the final vertical descent phase. It then used two of its four engines to slow its descent to 150 m (490 ft) and then hovered twice for about thirty seconds before touching down on the chosen optimal spot.

On 3 September 2023, before putting Vikram to sleep mode, ISRO conducted a hop on the lunar surface by firing its engines that moved it 40 cm (16 in) vertically as well as laterally before touching down again. The hop experiment proved to be the most significant test conducted by ISRO as the data would aid in future sample return missions under the programme. ISRO also attained a unique record of conducting its first vertical take-off and landing on an extraterrestrial surface before Earth; that was planned to be conducted under its Reusable technology demonstration programme.

=== Rovers ===
==== Pragyan (Chandrayaan-2) ====
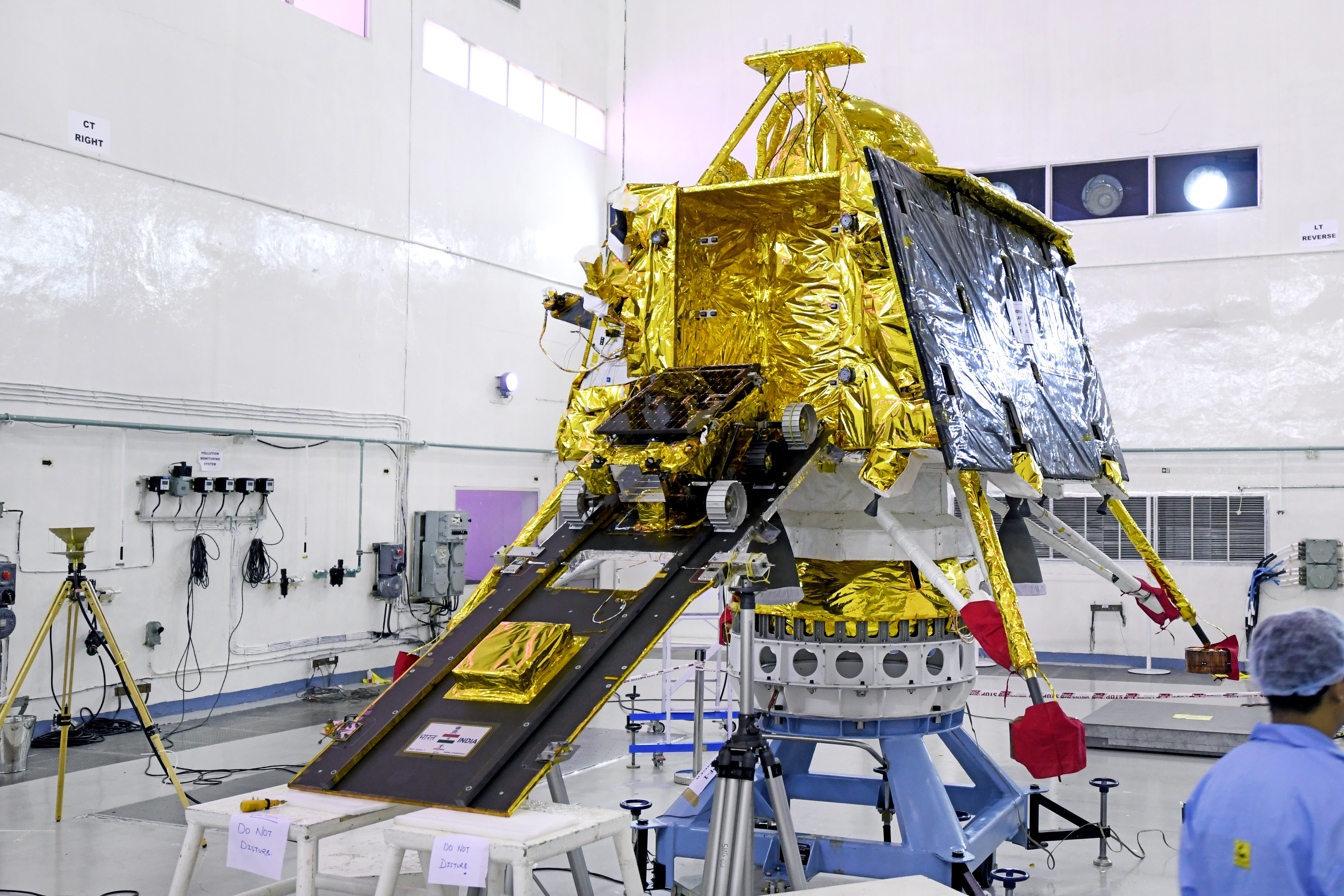
Pragyan rover on the ramp of the Vikram lander of the Chandrayaan-2 mission

The Rover named Pragyan carried two scientific payloads that were to be used in determining the elemental composition and its abundance near the landing site. It was designed to travel at a speed of 1 cm/s (0.39 in/s) and could drive up to 500 m (1,600 ft) in its lifetime. Both the lander and rover were expected to operate for one lunar day as they lacked any Radioisotope heater unit (RHU) and were entirely dependent on solar power for operations. The Chandrayaan-2's Pragyaan was precluded from its operations after the crash landing of its carrier Vikram.

==== Pragyan (Chandrayaan-3) ====
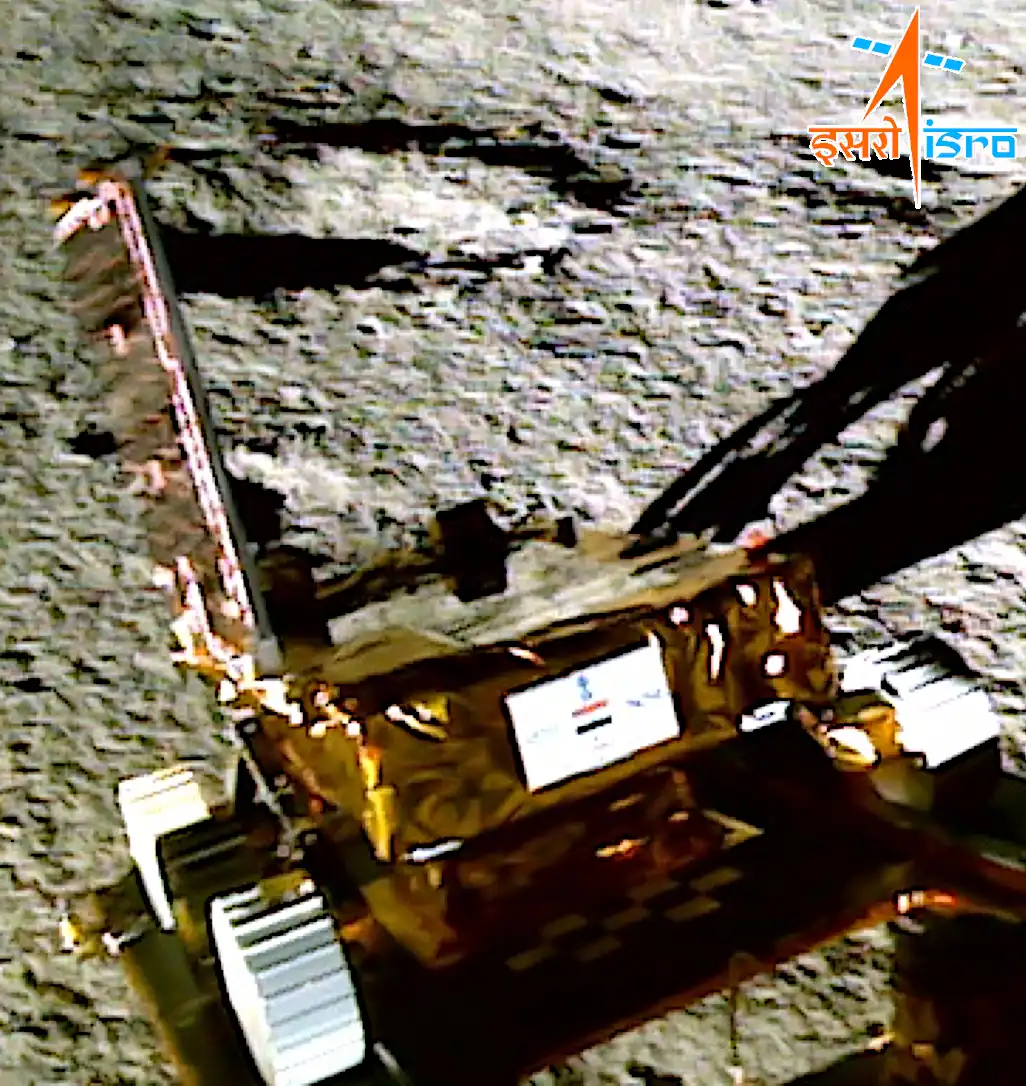
Chandrayaan-3's Pragyan rover rolling out of Vikram lander via ramp with the Indian emblem and flag

Unlike the lander, there were no changes made in the Pragyan rover except for switching ISRO's logo with the Emblem of India on the left and right wheels, respectively, that would imprint them on the regolith. The scientific objectives too remained unchanged since the previous mission. On 23 August 2023, a few hours after the soft landing, the ramp was deployed for the Pragyan to touch down and begin its operations on the surface. A few days later, the instruments were turned on, and the rover moved 8 m (26 ft) on the surface, thus achieving the primary goal of the mission. On 3 September 2023, with the lunar night approaching, the rover was shut down and put into 'sleep mode'.

== Science ==
The Chandrayaan programme has been widely regarded as successful, especially with the discovery of lunar water. It continues to provide scientific data and high-resolution imagery thanks to the Orbiter High Resolution Camera (OHRC), which is considered the most advanced lunar camera so far, with 25 cm (9.8 in) spatial resolution, and it is currently operational onboard Chandrayaan-2's orbiter. Chandrayaan-1 lost its contact a year before its intended duration; however, Chandrayaan-2's orbiter is carrying forward the research from orbit and is expected to remain operational until 2026. The first soft landing and on-site science mission of Chandrayaan-3 conducted the first experiments in the lunar south pole region, thus contributing to the understanding of the region which holds the potential for a future crewed lunar base.

=== Discovery of water on the Moon ===
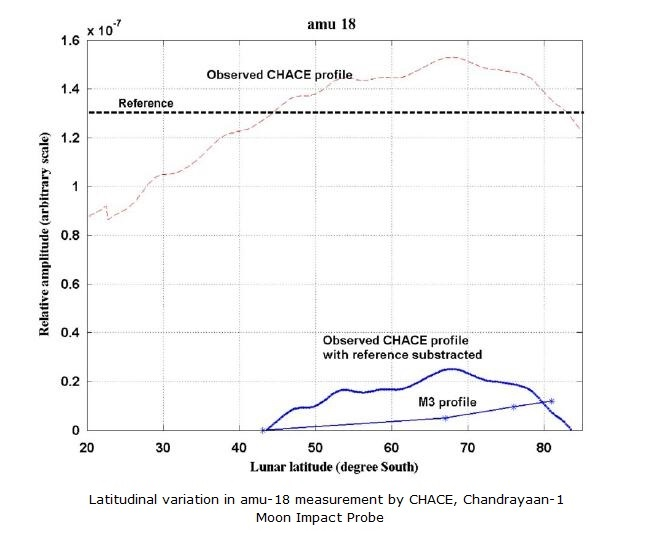
Direct evidence of lunar water in the Moon's atmosphere obtained by Chandra's Altitudinal Composition (ChACE) output profile

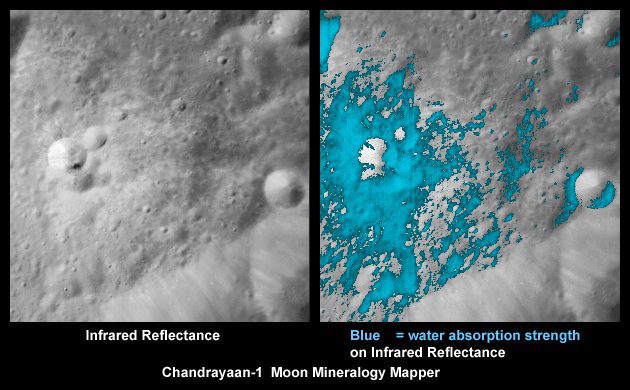
Second confirmation of water on the Moon by Chandrayaan-1's Moon Mineralogy Mapper that observed reflectance spectra of water ice.

The presence of water on the Moon has always been a matter of intense debate since the last century. The first study on lunar water was conducted in 1961, and it revealed that the polar regions, which have a high density of cold traps, have a higher probability of lunar water ice than the equatorial regions. The samples returned from the equatorial region during the Apollo program failed to provide definitive evidence, reinforcing the need for research on the lunar poles. Since there hadn't been any missions to the lunar poles and since the poles had been speculated to harbour the water ice, Moon Impact Probe's impact site was chosen in the lunar south pole to search for firm evidence of the same in the lunar atmosphere.

The Chandra's Altitudinal Composition (ChACE) was one of the three scientific instruments on board the Chandrayaan-1's Moon Impact Probe (MIP). It was a mass spectrometer that was developed to study the composition of the tenuous lunar exosphere through mass spectroscopy. On 12 November 2008, the MIP separated from the Chandrayaan-1 orbiter and began its descent to the surface, during which it detected the clear presence of molecules with atomic mass unit 18, i.e., water. The ionized water molecules (H2O^{+}) and their fragments (such as H^{+} and OH^{+} ions) were detected by ChACE. Three months later, the Moon Mineralogy Mapper (M^{3}) an imaging spectrometer on board the Chandrayaan-1 orbiter, also detected the presence of water. While observing the reflectance spectra of the Moon, it observed the absorption features of the water ice, which are in the 1.0-2.5 μm wavelength region. The shadowed regions that received the reflected light were chosen for the study, with water ice being found near the polar region.

The ChACE profile indicates a steady rise in the concentration of water molecules starting from 20 degrees south to the poles; however, it peaks at 60-70 degrees south and then declines. Overlaying the M^{3} profile, which begins at 43.1 degrees south, depicts a complementary nature of the recordings, confirming the double evidence of lunar water near the south pole. However, the detection of water in every spectrum of ChACE, coupled with the fact that it does not indicate either a steady rise or decline or a constant level in its profile, could possibly be due to contamination of water from Earth. Adding to the concerns was the M^{3}'s profile, which showed a steady increase towards the south pole, unlike ChACE, which saw a decline beyond 70 degrees south. But according to Indian mathematician Ramaiyengar Sridharan, if the water ice acts as a source due to sublimation, which would be a strong function of temperature in the prevailing ultra high vacuum condition, then, in the absence of fresh sources during the measurement phase, the increase/decrease in the concentration measured by ChACE should be at the cost of what M^{3} has detected in the form of ice; which means, the peak measurement recorded may be due to the presence of many water ice sources and the decline may be due to fewer such sources and while M^{3} mapped the water ice sources on the surface the MIP detected the vapour generated from these sources, thus complementing each other.

Despite the Chandrayaan-1 mission ending a year earlier than the intended duration of two years, the data recorded from the instruments onboard over 310 days were very useful even a decade later. In 2018, the data obtained from the M^{3} was used by the scientist at the University of Hawaiʻi, Dr. Shuai Li and his team to research lunar water in the dark craters of the poles. Since the data was patchy and hard for them to work with in the dark craters, they used the traces of sunlight that had bounced off crater walls and analyzed the spectral data to find places where the three specific wavelengths (in the range of 1.0-2.5 μm) of near-infrared light were absorbed, which indicated the presence of water ice. They conducted thorough statistical analysis to ensure that their findings were not influenced by random anomalies or errors in the instruments. "I consider this to be the most convincing evidence that you actually do have true water ice at the uppermost surface — what we call the optical surface — of the Moon", Li said on the results.

=== Surface features ===
Mapping and studying the lunar surface features were the primary scientific objectives of Chandrayaan-1. The first images of the surface were acquired by the Terrain Mapping Camera (TMC) onboard the mission's orbiter. The CMOS camera with 5 m (16 ft) resolution and a 40 km (25 mi) swath in the Panchromatic band was activated on 29 October 2008 (within Earth's orbit), and it had captured over 70,000 images during its 3,000 orbits around the Moon. While the other scientific missions at the time usually had a 100 m (330 ft) resolution, many of TMC's images had a sharp resolution of 5 m (16 ft), thus enabling the production of a detailed map of the Moon.

During mapping Rilles and Lava tubes on the lunar surface, the TMC discovered a large lava tube near the equator (specifically in the Oceanus Procellarum, to the north of the rille named Rima Galilaei above the lunar equator). The tube measured about 2 km (1.2 mi) in length and 360 m (1,180 ft) in width. The lunar lava tubes are considered potential habitation sites for future crewed outposts because they serve as natural shields against cosmic and solar radiation, meteorites, micrometeorites, and impact ejecta. They are also insulated from the extreme temperature variations on the lunar surface.

== Summary ==
=== List of missions ===
Landing

Intended hard landing
Successful soft landing
Unsuccessful soft landing

Map of Chandrayaan programme's landing locations (labels are clickable when viewing the original svg image).

| Mission | Launch Date | Launch Vehicle | Orbital Insertion Date | Landing Date | Return Date | Status | | | | |
| Mission | Launch Date | Launch Vehicle | Orbital Insertion Date | Landing Date | Return Date | Main Mission | Extended Mission | Expected Mission Duration | Total Mission Duration | Notes |
Orbiter and impactor
| Chandrayaan-1 | 22 October 2008 | PSLV-XL | 8 November 2008 | – | – | Success | – | 2 years | 310 days | India's first extraterrestrial mission; discovered water on the Moon. |
| Moon Impact Probe | 22 October 2008 | PSLV-XL | 8 November 2008 | 14 November 2008 | – | Success | – | 25 minutes | 25 minutes | India's first extraterrestrial mission; discovered water on the Moon. |
Soft landers and rovers
| Chandrayaan-2 | 22 July 2019 | LVM3 | 20 August 2019 | 6 September 2019 | – | Partial success | Ongoing | 7.5 years | 7 years, 2 months, 20 days elapsed | India's first Lunar lander and rover mission; lander crashed. |
| Chandrayaan-3 | 14 July 2023 | LVM3 | 5 August 2023 | 23 August 2023 | – | Success | Ongoing | 12 days 6 Months (PM) | 12 days (Note: The lander and rover were hoped to turn back on for operation on 22 September 2023 had they survived the 14-earth-day lunar night, but they failed to do so, thus ending the mission.) 3 years, 4 months and 8 days (PM) | India's first extraterrestrial soft landing; humanity's first soft landing near lunar south pole. Propulsion module still in service for engineering tests. |
Sample return
| Chandrayaan-4 | 2027 | LVM3-SC × 2 | TBD | TBD | TBD | TBD | TBD | 14 days | TBD | Docking experiment in lunar orbit, soft landing and spacecraft launch from Lunar surface. Planned sample return mission from Lunar surface. |
Onsite sampling
| LUPEX (Chandrayaan-5) | 2028–29 | H3 | TBD | TBD | – | TBD | TBD | 6 months | TBD | Collaborative lander and rover mission with JAXA. |
Tests pre-crewed lunar landing
| Chandrayaan-6 | 2033-34 | LMLV | TBD | | – | TBD | | | | Landing of the same lander to be used for the crewed lunar descent stage. |
| Chandrayaan-7 | 2036-37 | LMLV | TBD | | | | | | | First of the two Uncrewed end-to-end Human landing demonstration. |
| Chandrayaan-8 | 2036-37 | LMLV | TBD | | | | | | | Second of two Uncrewed end-to-end Human landing demonstration. |
Crewed Lunar missions
| Chandrayaan-H1 | 2038-39 | LMLV | TBD | | | | | | | India's first Crewed lunar flyby and orbiting mission. |
Crewed Lunar Landing
| Chandrayaan-H2 | 2040 | LMLV | TBD | | | | | | | India's first Crewed lunar landing. |

=== Timeline ===
The image above contains clickable links

Timeline of the Chandrayaan missions

=== Named sites ===
| Mission | Craft | Landing Date | Name | Region | Coordinates |
|---|---|---|---|---|---|
| Chandrayaan-1 | Moon Impact Probe | 14 November 2008 | Jawahar Point | Lunar south pole region | 89.76°S 39.40°W |
| Chandrayaan-2 | Vikram | 6 September 2019 | Tiranga Point | Lunar south pole region | 70.8810°S 22.7840°E |
| Chandrayaan-3 | Vikram | 23 August 2023 | Statio Shiv Shakti | Lunar south pole region | 69.3676°S 32.3481°E |
| Chandrayaan-3 | Pragyan | 23 August 2023 | Statio Shiv Shakti | Lunar south pole region | 69.3676°S 32.3481°E |

== Future ==
=== On-site sampling and sample return ===
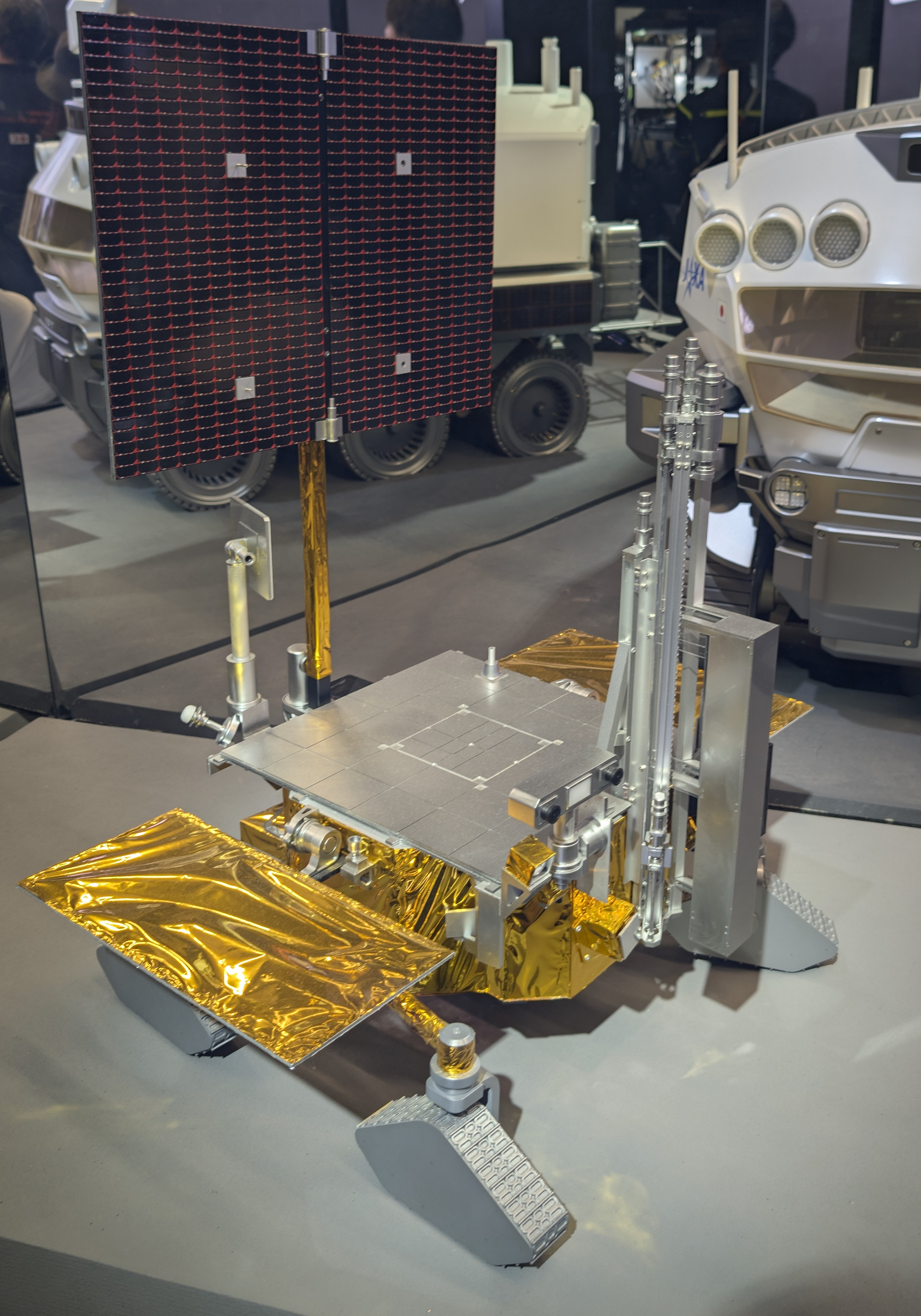
Scale model (1/4) of LUPEX at JAXA pavilion at Expo 2025

Chandrayaan-4 is a planned lunar sample-return mission of ISRO and will be the fourth mission in its Chandrayaan programme. It consists of four modules namely Transfer module (TM), Lander module (LM), Ascender module (AM) and Reentry Module (RM). The planned mission life is 1 lunar day, and the landing site is near to Statio Shiv Shakti, the landing site of Chandrayaan-3's Lander.

With successful demonstration in soft landing and roving, the programme then moved into its next phase where a rover with greater scientific payload is to be sent to conduct on-site sample analysis. The mission named LUPEX is suggested to be launched in the time frame of 2028–29. India is collaborating with Japan in this mission. It will be a lander-rover mission near lunar pole to perform on-site sampling and analysis of collected lunar material and demonstrate lunar night survival technologies. The Indian Government gave approval for the mission, referred as Chandrayaan-5 on 14 March 2025.

=== Long duration exploration ===
Building upon this foundation subsequent missions will explore long-term presence on the Moon, including the potential development of habitats. Each flight is designed to progressively expand India's capabilities in lunar exploration, potentially with the co-operation of all Artemis accords signatories. Future Missions from the tentative Chandrayaan-6 will focus on developing the critical infrastructure required for future human lunar landings. ISRO also announced a collaboration with the Department of Atomic Energy (DAE) to power future missions using nuclear cells. In an Interview, the then ISRO chairman S. Somanath has informed that India will continue sending robotic lunar explorers until an indigenous crewed mission, with the robotic program also continuing after that.

== Gallery ==
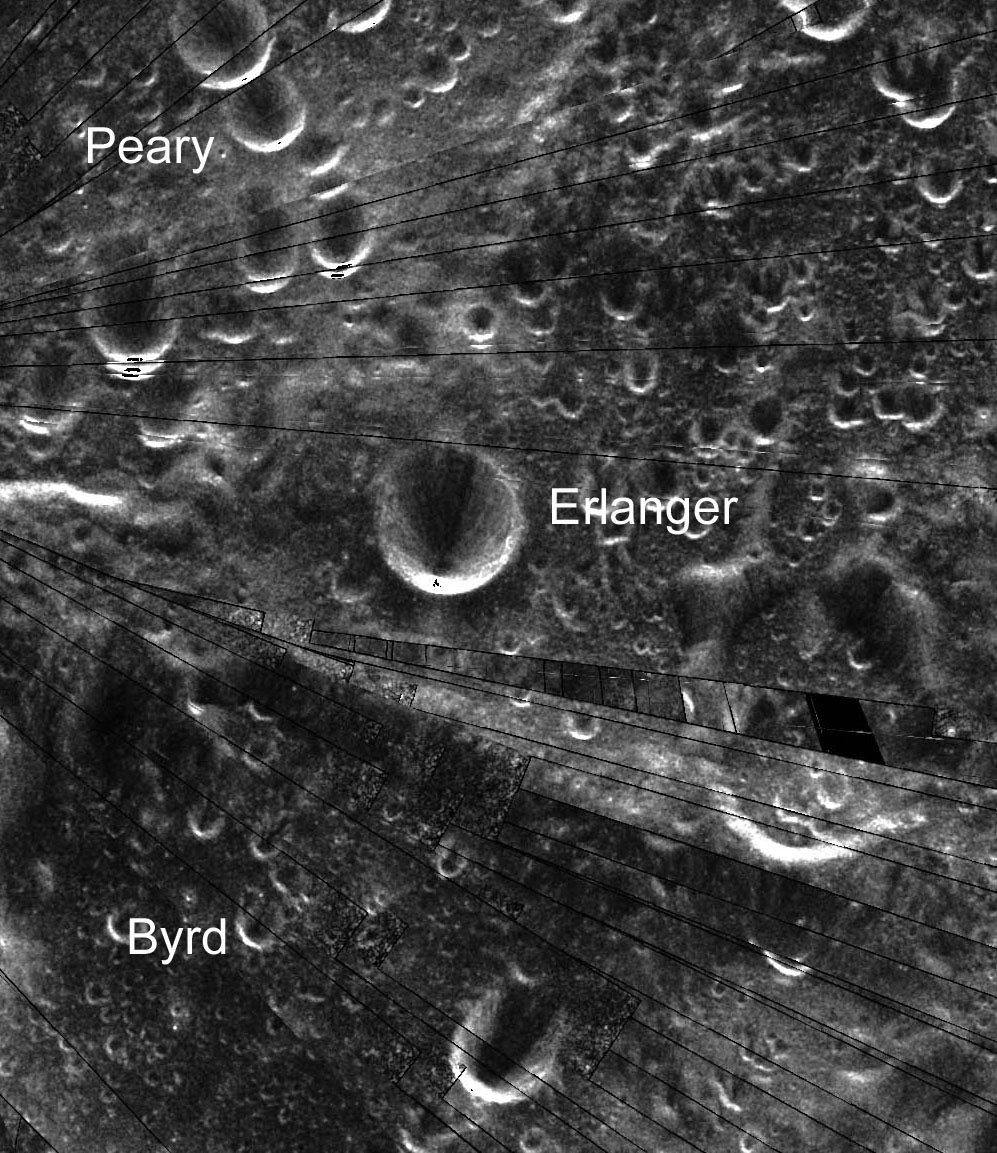
Mini SAR radar image of Erlanger crater by Chandrayaan-1.

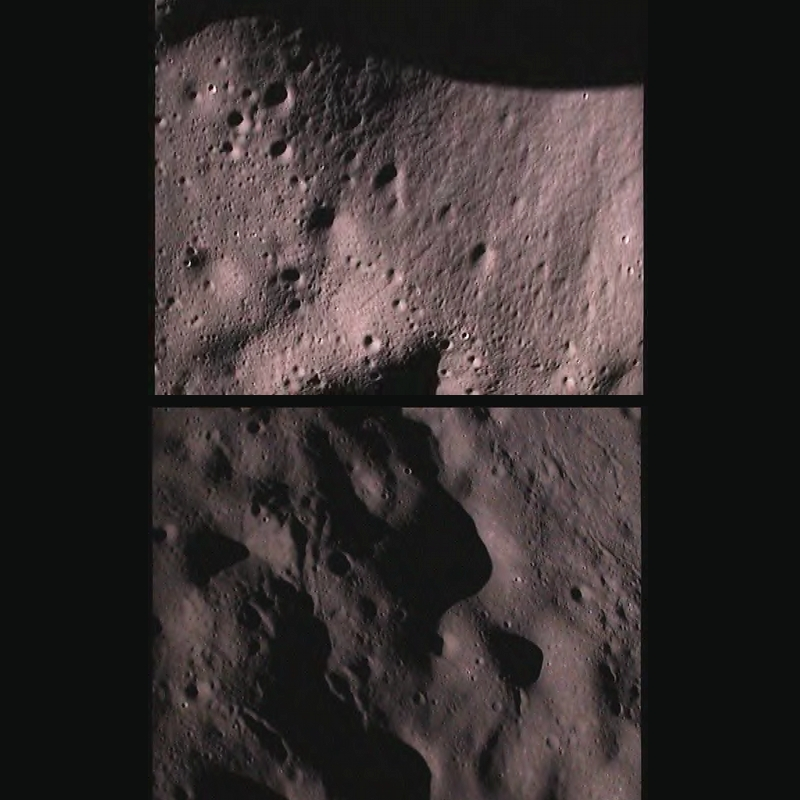
Images taken by Moon Impact Probe before performing a hard landing near the outer rim of Shackleton crater in the Lunar south pole region.

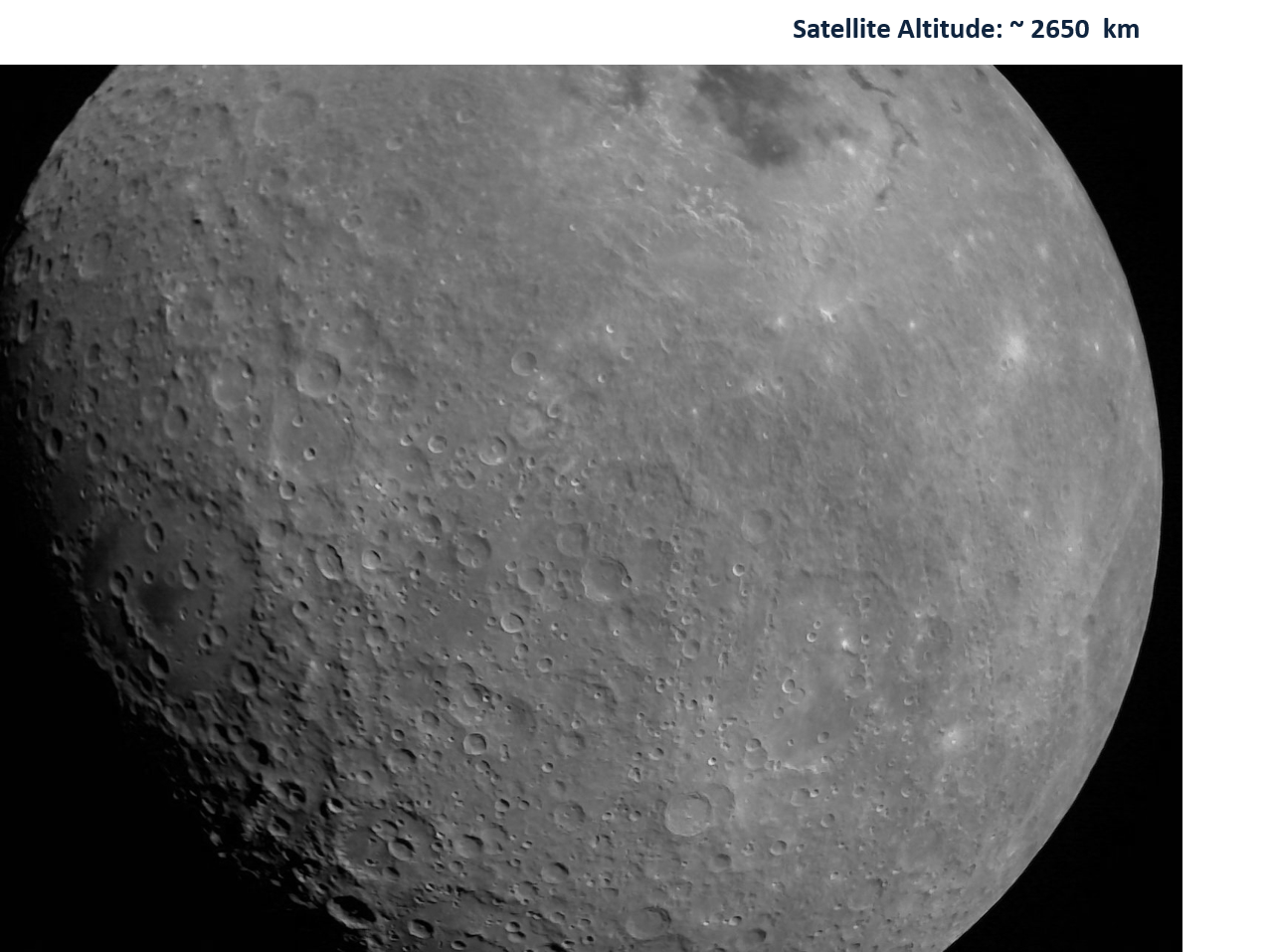
Far side of the Moon as viewed by Chandrayaan-2's LI4 (Lander Imager 4) Camera, 21 August 2019.

The Moon, as viewed by Chandrayaan-3 during Lunar Orbit Insertion.

== See also ==
- List of missions to the Moon
- Indian Mars exploration missions
- Indian Human Spaceflight Programme
- Artemis program – NASA-led lunar exploration program
- Luna-Glob – Moon exploration program by the Russian Federal Space Agency
- Chinese Lunar Exploration Program
