= Statio Shiv Shakti =

Lunar landing site of Chandrayaan-3

Statio Shiva Shakti
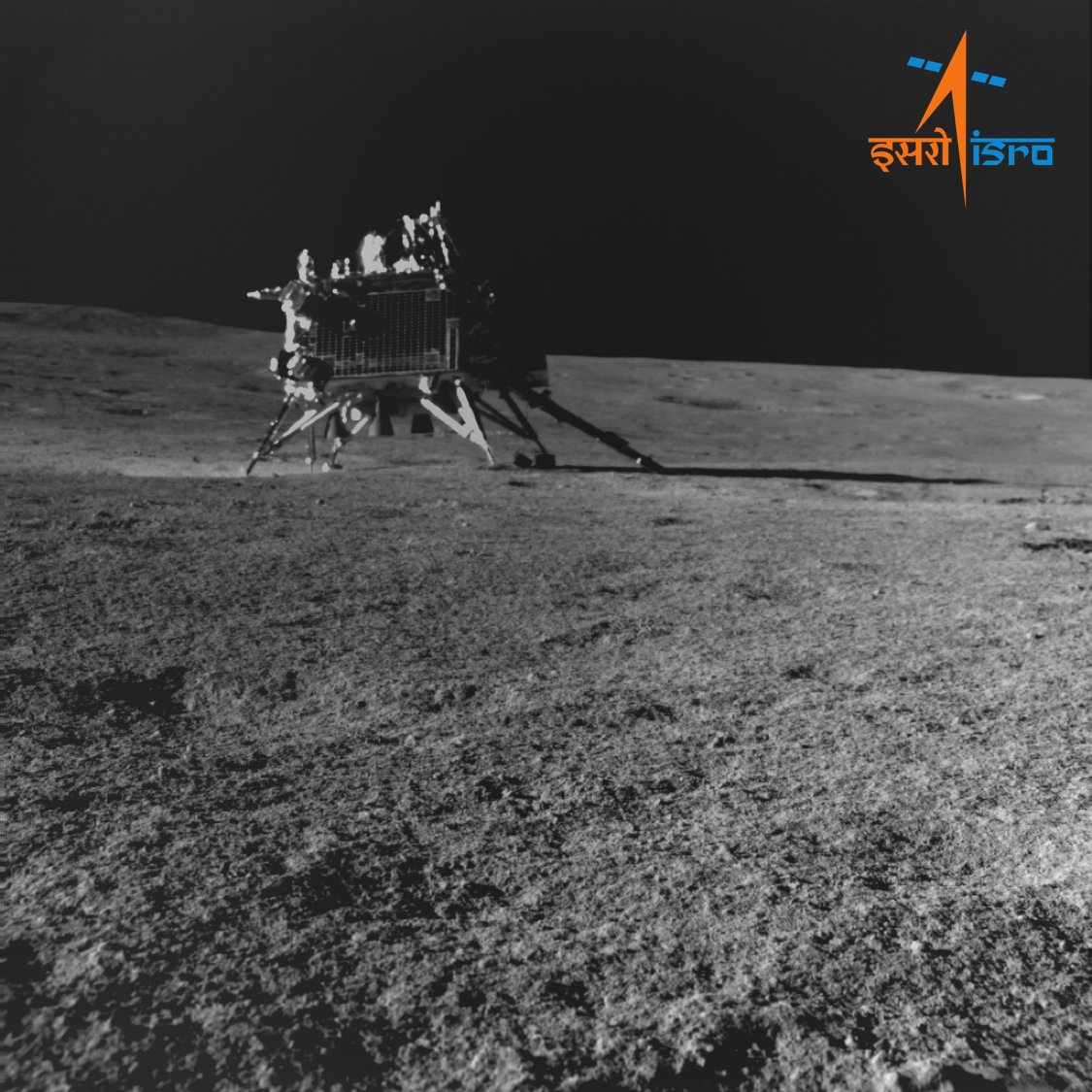
- Chandrayaan-3 lander on Shiva Shakti Point; photographed by Pragyan rover

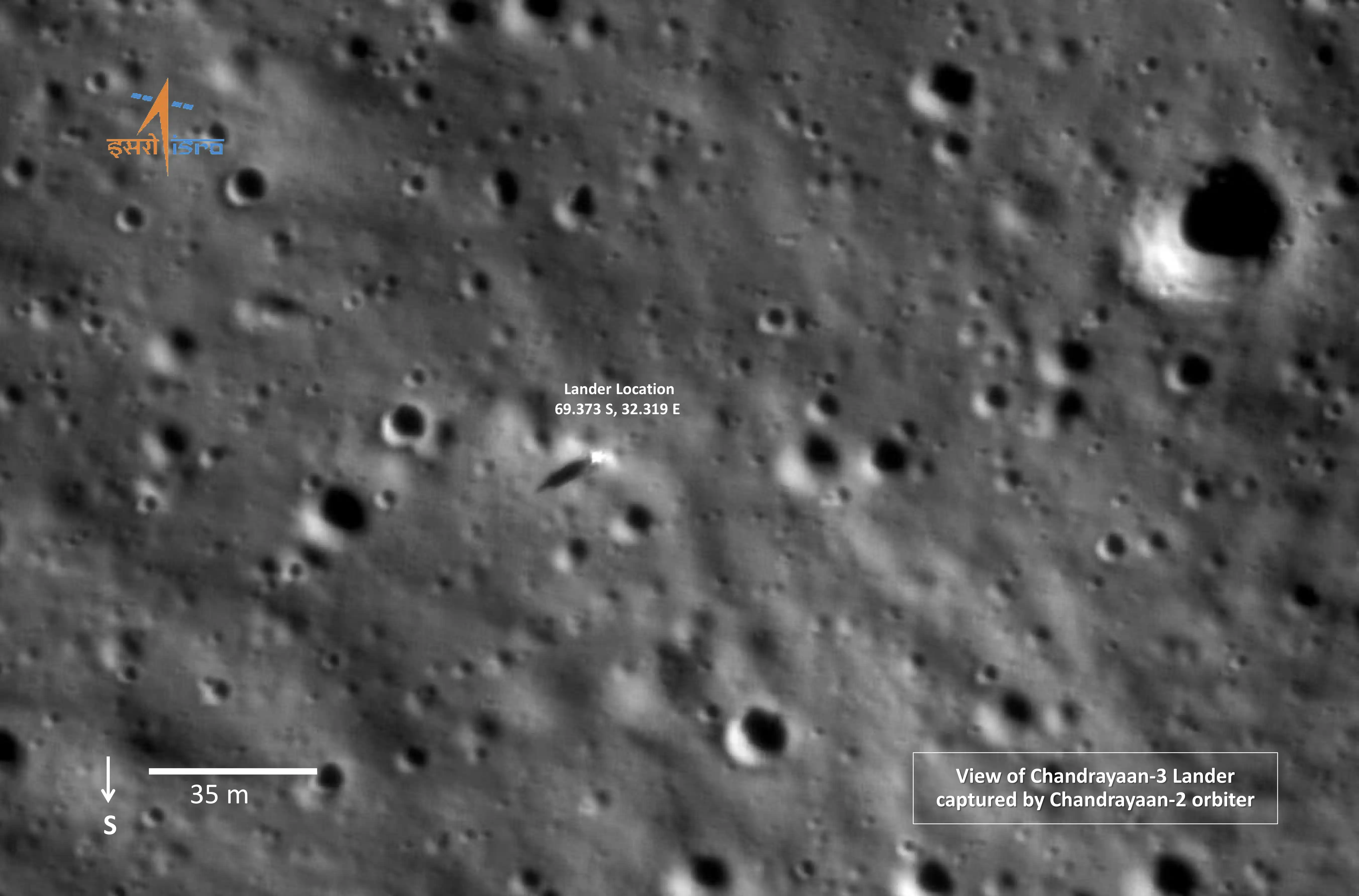
- Image of Chandrayaan-3 lander captured by OHRC camera aboard Chandrayaan-2 orbiter
- 69.373°S 32.319°E
- Type: Extraterrestrial landing site
- Location: Area between Manzinus C and Simpelius N craters, Moon

History
- Founded: Announced: August 26, 2023; IAU Approved: March 19, 2024
- Founder: Chandrayaan-3

Shiv Shakti Point is the landing site of Chandrayaan-3, the third lunar mission of ISRO. The mission's lander Vikram and rover Pragyan landed 600 km from the south pole of the Moon on 23 August 2023. The landing site was named on 26 August 2023 at the ISTRAC headquarters in Bengaluru, after India became the fourth nation to make a successful soft landing on the Moon and also becoming the first country that landed on the lunar south pole. (Note: Often reported in media as "polar region", the landing site of Chandrayaan-3 is actually outside the Lunar Antarctic circle (80ºS). ISRO scientists involved in selecting and characterizing the landing site call it a “high-latitude location". or "near polar region") Statio Shiv Shakti is located at the coordinates 69.373°S 32.319°E and lies between the lunar craters Manzinus C and Simpelius N. It has been proposed that the upcoming sample-return mission Chandrayaan-4 also land near the point.

== Name ==
The name Shiv Shakti is derived from the names of Hindu deities Shiva, who is also associated with the Moon, and Shakti, the divine feminine energy, who is often depicted as the consort of Shiva in the form of goddess Parvati.

== Geological history ==
Using high-resolution remote sensing datasets, Geologists have estimated that the site is over 3.7 billion years old. The geological map of the landing site reveals that debris from the nearby Schomberger crater covers the area. Further analysis revealed the landscape is scattered with boulders, some of which exceed 5 metres in size with most of them originating from a fresh, 540-metre crater located 14 km south of the point. To the west side are smaller, centimetre-sized rock fragments, which likely came from a nearby 10-metre-wide crater. Temperature reading obtained from the ChaSTE experiment indicated that from about (~8 AM - 4 PM Local time at the Moon) reported a peak surface temperature of about 355 K (± 0.5 K), with another independent sensor reporting it at ~332K (±1K), showcasing meter-sale variations for high latitude areas on the moon. This was an observational first for the Instrument and the probe. An Indian researcher living in Germany, Chandra Tungathurthi, created a 3-D elevation map of the region by blending data received from the Chandrayaan-2 orbiter's OHRC camera.

== Announcement ==
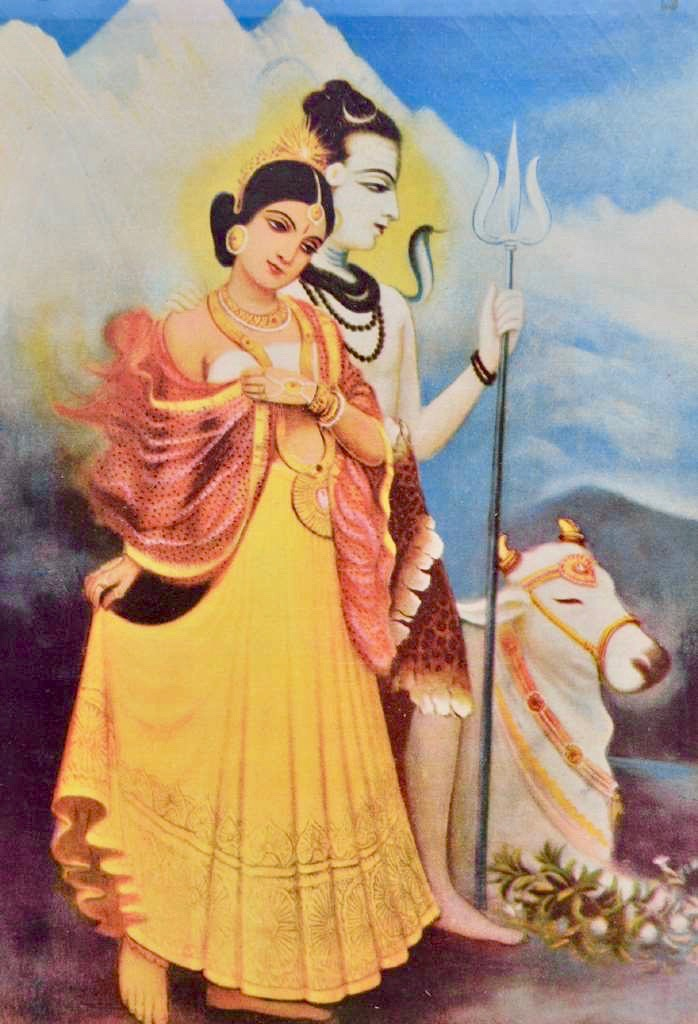
The landing point of Chandrayaan-3 is named after the Hindu deities Shiva and Shakti

The name was announced by Prime Minister Narendra Modi on August 26, 2023 while meeting ISRO scientists in Bangalore. Prime Minister Modi noted that the selection of "Shiva-Shakti" was based on concept of "Shiva" as humanity's determination and "Shakti" as the capability to actualize these humanitarian ambitions, while further noting that "Shakti" is also a tribute to the women scientists.

On 19 March 2024, the International Astronomical Union Working Group for Planetary System Nomenclature approved the name Statio Shiv Shakti for the landing site of Chandrayaan-3’s Vikram lander.

== Reaction ==
The naming of the landing site as "Shiv Shakti" drew criticism from certain sections of opposition political parties, who said that the religious naming contradicted India's secular nature. However the government countered the criticisms by stating that the hard landing site of Chandrayaan-1 was named after India's first prime minister Jawaharlal Nehru.

ISRO chairman S. Somanath said that there is no need for controversy over the naming as governments are allowed to name sites on lunar surface and that there have been precedents of names being assigned to lunar features. "It's not the first time such name has been given. Indian names are already there. We have a Sarabhai Crater on the Moon. Each country can give their names. Naming is a tradition. There is no controversy over the matter," he said. Former ISRO chairman G Madhavan Nair also echoed this and said that the whole controversy was completely based on 'misinterpretation'. He said 'shakti' refers to the 'force' that is behind the creation of this universe. "Our pandits and rishis named it Shiva. Our Puranas gave it a form as people could not understand the concept of the force, and that is how the human form and Kailasa all came. It is a different matter. This underlying principle is known as 'shakti' and we do not have to attribute religious motives to it" he concluded.

== See also ==
- Chandrayaan programme
- Jawahar Point
- Tiranga Point
