= Tiranga Point =

Chandrayaan-2's crash site

The Tiranga Point is a location on the Moon near the lunar south pole where Chandrayaan-2's lander Vikram crashed. The site was named on 26 August 2023 at the ISTRAC headquarters in Bengaluru. It is located on the coordinates 70.8810°S 22.7840°E and it lies between Manzinus C and Simpelius N craters.

The Prime Minister of India, Narendra Modi said, "The spot on the lunar surface where the Chandrayaan-2 left its footprints in 2019 will be known as 'Tiranga'. This will be an inspiration for every effort made by India. It will remind us any failure is not final." The name Tiranga is derived from the Hindi words Tin and Ranga (originally from the Sanskrit words Tri and Ranga) which colloquially means the Tricolour of National Flag of India.

== See also ==
- Chandrayaan programme
- Jawahar Point
- Statio Shiv Shakti
