= Pragyan (Chandrayaan-2) =

Indian lunar rover

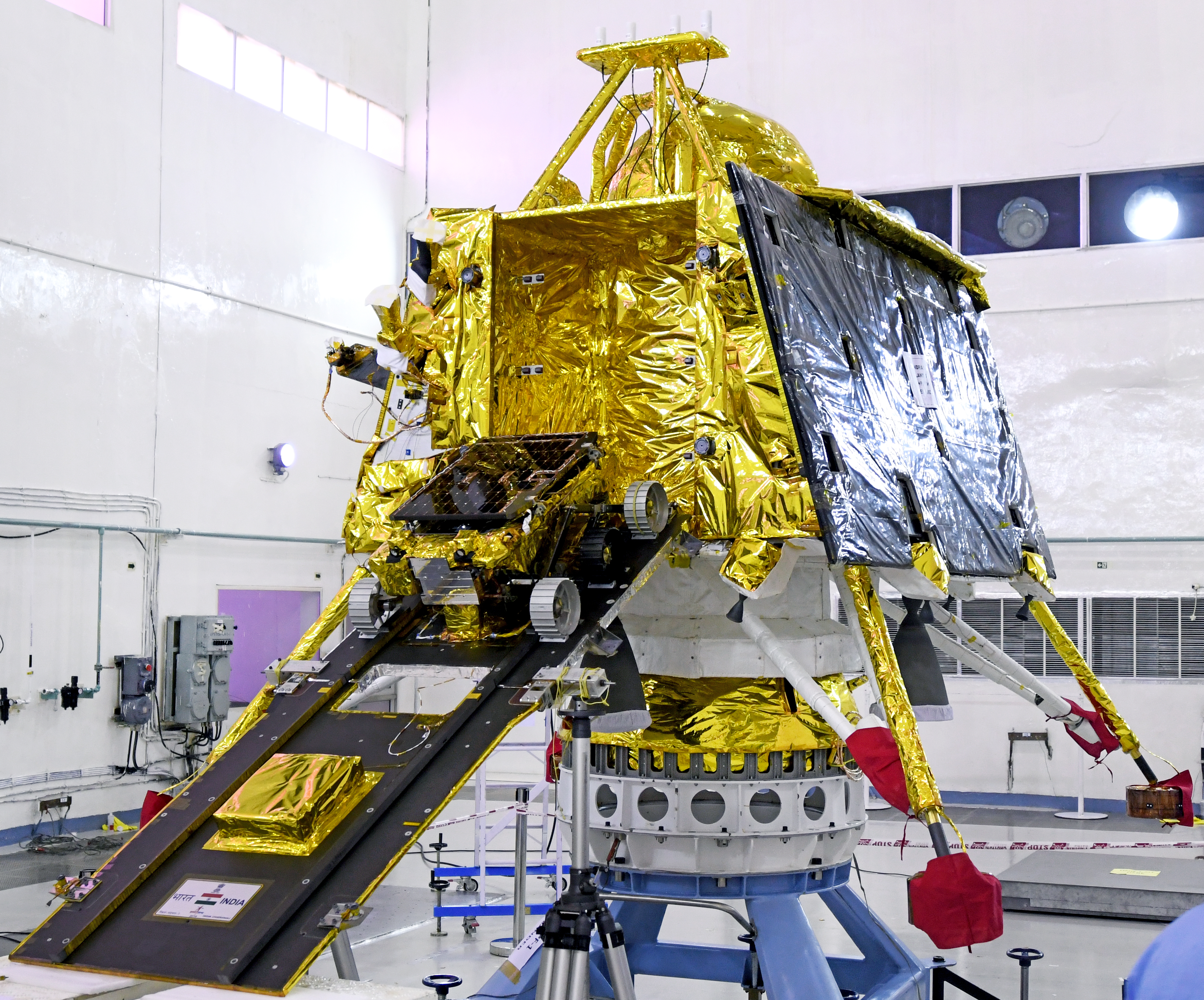
- Pragyan mounted on the ramp of Vikram lander
- Mission type: Lunar rover
- Operator: ISRO
- Mission duration: 0 days (landing failure)

Spacecraft properties
- Manufacturer: ISRO
- Landing mass: 27 kg (60 lb)
- Dimensions: 0.9 m × 0.75 m × 0.85 m (3.0 ft × 2.5 ft × 2.8 ft)
- Power: 50 W from solar panels

Start of mission
- Launch date: 22 July 2019 14:43:12 IST (09:13:12 UTC)
- Rocket: LVM3 M1, LVM3 M4
- Launch site: SDSC Second launch pad
- Contractor: ISRO
- Deployed from: Vikram
- Deployment date: 7 September 2019 (intended, never deployed from destroyed lander)

Lunar rover
- Landing date: 6 September 2019, 20:00–21:00 UTC
- Landing site: Attempted: 70.90267°S 22.78110°E (Intended); Crash landing at least 500m away from planned site. (Actual)
- Distance driven: 500 m (1,600 ft) (intended)

Pragyan (from Sanskrit: प्रज्ञान, romanized: prajñāna, lit. 'wisdom') was a lunar rover that formed part of Chandrayaan-2, a lunar mission developed by the Indian Space Research Organisation (ISRO). The rover was launched as part of Chandrayaan-2 on 22 July 2019 and was destroyed with its lander, Vikram, when it crashed on the Moon on 6 September 2019.

In July 2023, Chandrayaan-3 launched, carrying new versions of Vikram and Pragyan, which successfully landed near the lunar south pole on 23 August 2023.

== Overview ==
Pragyan had a mass of about 27 kg (60 lb) and dimensions of 0.9 m × 0.75 m × 0.85 m (3.0 ft × 2.5 ft × 2.8 ft), with a power output of 50 watts. It was designed to operate on solar power. The rover moved on six wheels and was intended to traverse 500 m (1,600 ft) on the lunar surface at the rate of 1 cm (0.39 in) per second, performing on-site analysis and sending the data to its lander for relay back to the Earth. For navigation, the rover was equipped with:

- Stereoscopic camera-based 3D vision: two 1-megapixel, monochromatic NAVCAMs in front of the rover to provide the ground control team with a 3D view of the surrounding terrain, and help in path-planning by generating a digital elevation model of the terrain. IIT Kanpur contributed to the development of the subsystems for light-based map generation and motion planning for the rover.
- Control and motor dynamics: the rover design has a rocker-bogie suspension system and six wheels, each driven by independent brushless DC electric motors. Steering is accomplished by differential speed of the wheels or skid steering.

The expected operating time of the rover was one lunar day or around 14 Earth days, as its electronics were not designed to endure the frigid lunar night. Its power system had a solar-powered sleep and wake-up cycle, which could result in a longer operation time than planned.

== History ==
=== Planned landing site ===
Two landing sites were selected in the lunar south polar region, each with a landing ellipse of 32 km × 11 km (19.9 mi × 6.8 mi). The prime landing site (PLS54) is at 70.90267°S 22.78110°E, approximately 350 km (220 mi) north of the rim of the South Pole–Aitken basin. The alternative landing site (ALS01) is at 67.87406°S 18.46947°W. The prime site is on a high plain between the craters Manzinus C and Simpelius N, on the near side of the Moon. The criteria used to select the landing zones were a location in the south polar region and on the near side, a slope less than 15 degrees, with boulders less than 50 cm (20 in) in diameter, a crater and boulder distribution, being sunlit for at least 14 days, and with nearby ridges not shadowing the site for long durations.

Both the planned site and the alternative site are located within the polar LQ30 quadrangle. The surface likely consists of impact melt, possibly mantled by ejecta from the massive South Pole–Aitken basin and mixing by subsequent nearby impacts. The nature of the melt is mostly mafic, meaning it is rich in silicate minerals, magnesium, and iron. The region could also offer scientifically valuable rocks from the lunar mantle if the basin impactor excavated all the way through the crust.

=== Crash landing and destruction ===
The lander Vikram, carrying Pragyan, separated from the Chandrayaan-2 orbiter on 7 September 2019 and was scheduled to land on the Moon at around 1:50 a.m. IST. The initial descent was considered within mission parameters, passing critical braking procedures as planned. The descent and soft-landing was to be done by the onboard computers on Vikram, with mission control unable to make corrections.

The lander's trajectory began to deviate at about 2.1 kilometers (1.3 mi; 6,900 ft) above the surface. The final telemetry readings during ISRO's live-stream show that Vikram's final vertical velocity was 58 m/s (210 km/h; 130 mph) at 330 m (1,080 ft) above the surface, which according to the MIT Technology Review was "quite fast for a lunar landing". Initial reports suggested a crash, and were later confirmed by ISRO chairman K. Sivan, stating that the lander location had been found, and "it must had been a hard landing". The Lunar Reconnaissance Orbiter took images of the crash site, showing that the lander had been destroyed by the impact, creating an impact site and debris field spanning kilometers.

== See also ==
- Pragyan (Chandrayaan-3)
- Artemis program, NASA's lunar program
- Luna-Glob, Russian lunar program
- Rover (space exploration)
