= Muthayya Vanitha =

Indian electronics system engineer

- Born: 2 August 1964 (age 61); Chennai, India
- Occupation: Scientist
- Years active: 1987–present
- Organization: Indian Space Research Organisation (ISRO)

Muthayya Vanitha is an Indian electronics system engineer who has led projects on satellites at the Indian Space Research Organization. She was the project director of the Chandrayaan-2 lunar mission of the ISRO.

== Early life and education ==
Vanitha is from Chennai, India and originally trained as a design engineer. She completed her schooling in Boiler plant school Trichy. She graduated from College of Engineering, Guindy.

== Career ==
Vanitha has worked at ISRO for over three decades. She joined the ISRO as a junior engineer working in various areas of hardware testing and development. She later succeeded to managerial positions, leading the Telemetry and Telecommand Divisions in the Digital Systems Group of ISRO Satellite Centre. She has also acted as deputy project director for several satellites including Cartosat-1, Oceansat-2, and Megha-Tropiques, where she was responsible for data operations. Vanitha was also involved in the successful Mangalyaan mission to Mars in 2013.

=== Chandrayaan-2 ===
Vanitha was promoted from associate director to project director for ISRO's Chandrayaan-2 lunar mission. She is the first woman to lead an interplanterary mission at the ISRO. She is also the first woman project director at ISRO. Previous Chandrayaan-1 project director, Mylswamy Annadurai, who convinced her to take on the role, said that her data handling, team management and problem solving skills made her the ideal person for this position. Vanitha's responsibilities include ensuring complete oversight of the development and implementation of all systems and acting as a point of authority for the project. The launch successfully occurred on 22 July 2019. Unlike Chandrayaan-1, aimed to land a probe on the Moon surface rather than orbit around it.

== Awards and honours ==
Vanitha received an award for Best Woman Scientist by the Astronomical Society of India in 2006. She was also noted as one of five scientists to watch by Nature in 2019.
