= Pragyan (Chandrayaan-3) =

Indian lunar rover

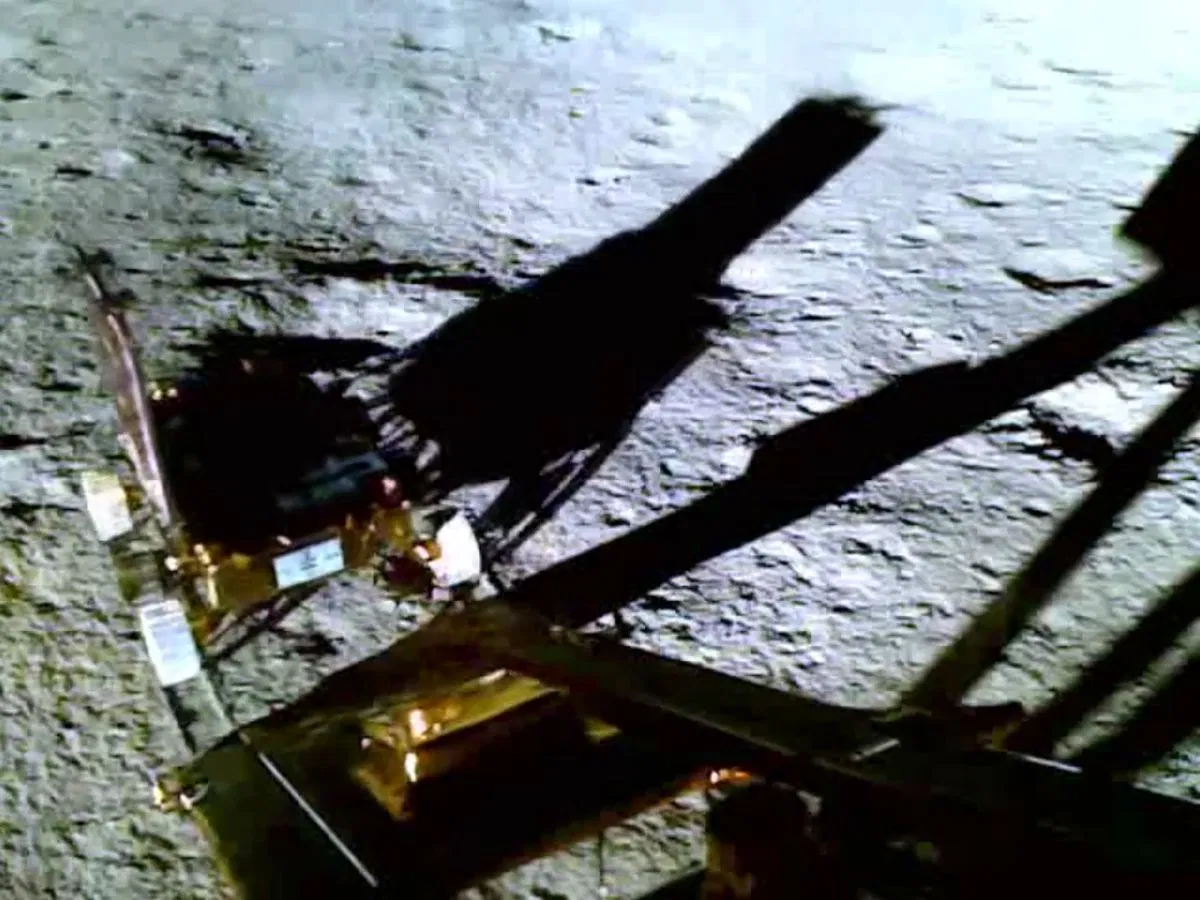
- Pragyan roll out on Moon
- Mission type: Lunar rover
- Operator: ISRO
- Mission duration: 12 days (final)

Spacecraft properties
- Manufacturer: ISRO
- Landing mass: 26 kg (57 lb)
- Dimensions: 0.9 m × 0.75 m × 0.85 m (3.0 ft × 2.5 ft × 2.8 ft)
- Power: 50 W from solar panels

Start of mission
- Launch date: 14 July 2023 14:35 IST (09:05 UTC)
- Rocket: LVM3 M4
- Launch site: SDSC Second launch pad
- Contractor: ISRO
- Deployed from: Vikram
- Deployment date: 23 August 2023

Lunar rover
- Landing date: 23 August 2023, 12:32 UTC
- Distance driven: 101.4 m (333 ft)

Pragyan (from Sanskrit: प्रज्ञान, romanized: prajñāna, lit. 'wisdom') is a lunar rover that forms part of Chandrayaan-3, a lunar mission developed by the Indian Space Research Organisation (ISRO).

A previous iteration of the rover, also named Pragyan, was launched as part of Chandrayaan-2 on 22 July 2019, but it was destroyed with its lander, Vikram, when it crashed on the Moon on 6 September. Chandrayaan-3 launched on 14 July 2023, carrying new versions of Vikram and Pragyan, which successfully landed near the lunar south pole on 23 August 2023.

== Overview ==
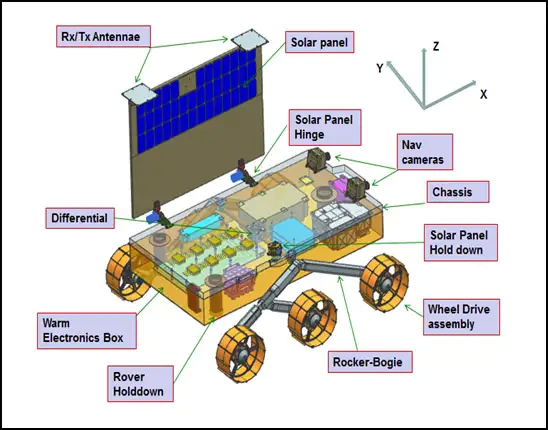
Schematic view of the rover

Pragyan has a mass of about 27 kg (60 lb) and dimensions of 0.9 m × 0.75 m × 0.85 m (3.0 ft × 2.5 ft × 2.8 ft), with a power output of 50 watts. It is designed to operate on solar power. The rover moves on six wheels and is intended to traverse 500 m (1,600 ft) on the lunar surface at the rate of 1 cm (0.39 in) per second, performing on-site analysis and sending the data to its lander for relay back to the Earth. For navigation, the rover is equipped with :

- Stereoscopic Camera-based 3D Vision : Two 1-megapixel, monochromatic NAVCAMs in front of the rover to provide the ground control team a 3D view of the surrounding terrain, and help in path-planning by generating a digital elevation model of the terrain. IIT Kanpur contributed to the development of the subsystems for light-based map generation and motion planning for the rover.
- Control and Motor Dynamics : The rover design has a rocker-bogie suspension system and six wheels, each driven by independent brushless DC electric motors. Steering is accomplished by differential speed of the wheels or skid steering.

The expected operating time of the rover is one lunar day or around 14 Earth days, as its electronics are not designed to endure the frigid lunar night. Its power system has a solar-powered sleep and wake-up cycle, which could result in a longer operation time than planned.

== History ==
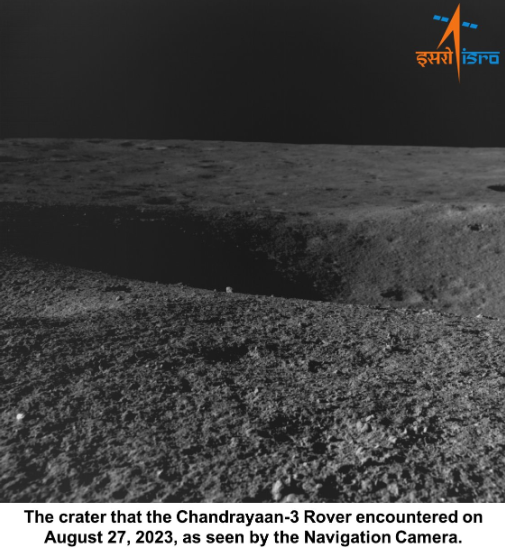
A four-meter diameter crater, as captured by the Navigation camera onboard the rover.

Chandrayaan-3 was launched aboard an LVM3-M4 rocket on 14 July 2023, at 09:05 UTC from Satish Dhawan Space Centre Second Launch Pad in Sriharikota, Andhra Pradesh, India. On 23 August 2023, as the lander approached the low point of its orbit, its four engines fired as a braking manoeuvre at 30 kilometres (19 mi) above the Moon's surface. After 11.5 minutes, the lander was 7.2 km (4.5 miles) above the surface; it maintained this altitude for about 10 seconds, then stabilized itself using eight smaller thrusters and rotated from a horizontal to a vertical position while continuing its descent.

It then used two of its four engines to slow its descent to roughly 150 metres (490 ft); it hovered there for about 30 seconds and located an optimal landing spot before continuing downward and touching down at 12:32 UTC.

After reaching the Moon's south pole, Chandrayaan-3 deployed the rover to explore the cratered surface, harnessed integrated cameras to send back videos of its environment, and started working on the research objectives planned for a two-week exploration of the Moon.

The first video of the rover, posted on 25 August 2023, showed it leaving the Vikram lander on a ramp and driving onto the Moon. ISRO posted the video in a thread on Twitter that also included footage from the lander approaching its landing site and kicking up dust as it touched down on the surface. ISRO wrote afterwards that the rover's two scientific instruments had been turned on and that it had moved eight meters.

On 26 August, the ISRO posted a new video, shot from the lander, of the rover's drive away, moving almost out of the lander's sight. On 27 August, it published two pictures after the rover encountered a large crater positioned three metres ahead of its location. However, the rover safely headed on a new path afterwards.

Later on 30 August, at 7:35 am, the rover took a picture of the Vikram lander, showing its two payloads, Chaste and ILSA, had deployed. Another image was captured at 11:04 the same day, from a distance of 15 m.

On September 2, the rover finished all assignments and entered into a sleep mode in preparation for wake up on September 22, however, it was not expected to continue working. Its battery was fully charged when it went into hibernation. However, after more than two weeks, both the rover and its lander's reactivations were delayed to the 23rd for unspecified reasons. As of 28 September 2023, the rover still had not woken and no updates have been provided by ISRO since. The Pragyan rover is presumed to be dead.

== See also ==
- Artemis program, NASA's lunar program
- Luna-Glob, Russian lunar program
- Rover (space exploration)
- Lunar rover
- List of missions to the Moon
