= Kalpana Kalahasti =

Indian scientist and Electronics Engineer

Kalpana K
- Born: 1974 (age 50–51); Chennai, Tamil Nadu, India
- Occupation(s): Electronics and Communication Engineer
- Years active: 2000–present
- Organization: Indian Space Research Organisation (ISRO)

Kalpana Kalahasti (born 1974) is an Indian scientist and Electronics and Communication Engineer working in the Indian Space Research Organisation (ISRO). She currently serves as the Associate Project director of the Chandrayaan-3 mission. Kalpana has been instrumental in the construction of various satellites of India and was involved in the Chandrayaan-2 mission.

== Early life and education ==
Kalpana was born in Chennai in 1974.

She graduated in Electronics and Communication Engineering from Madras University.

== Career ==
In 2000, she joined ISRO as a scientist. In the early years, Kalpana worked on various satellite projects and played a key role in the successful launch of several communication and remote sensing satellites. She has been at the forefront from developing propulsion systems for accurate satellite positioning to designing advanced imaging equipment to capture high-resolution images of the Earth. She eventually became a part of Chandrayaan-2 mission a landmark project for ISRO. In 2019, she was appointed as the Associate Project Director of the Chandrayaan-3 mission and was instrumental in designing and optimizing the lunar lander systems.
