= Chandrayaan-2 =

Indian lunar mission (2019–Present)

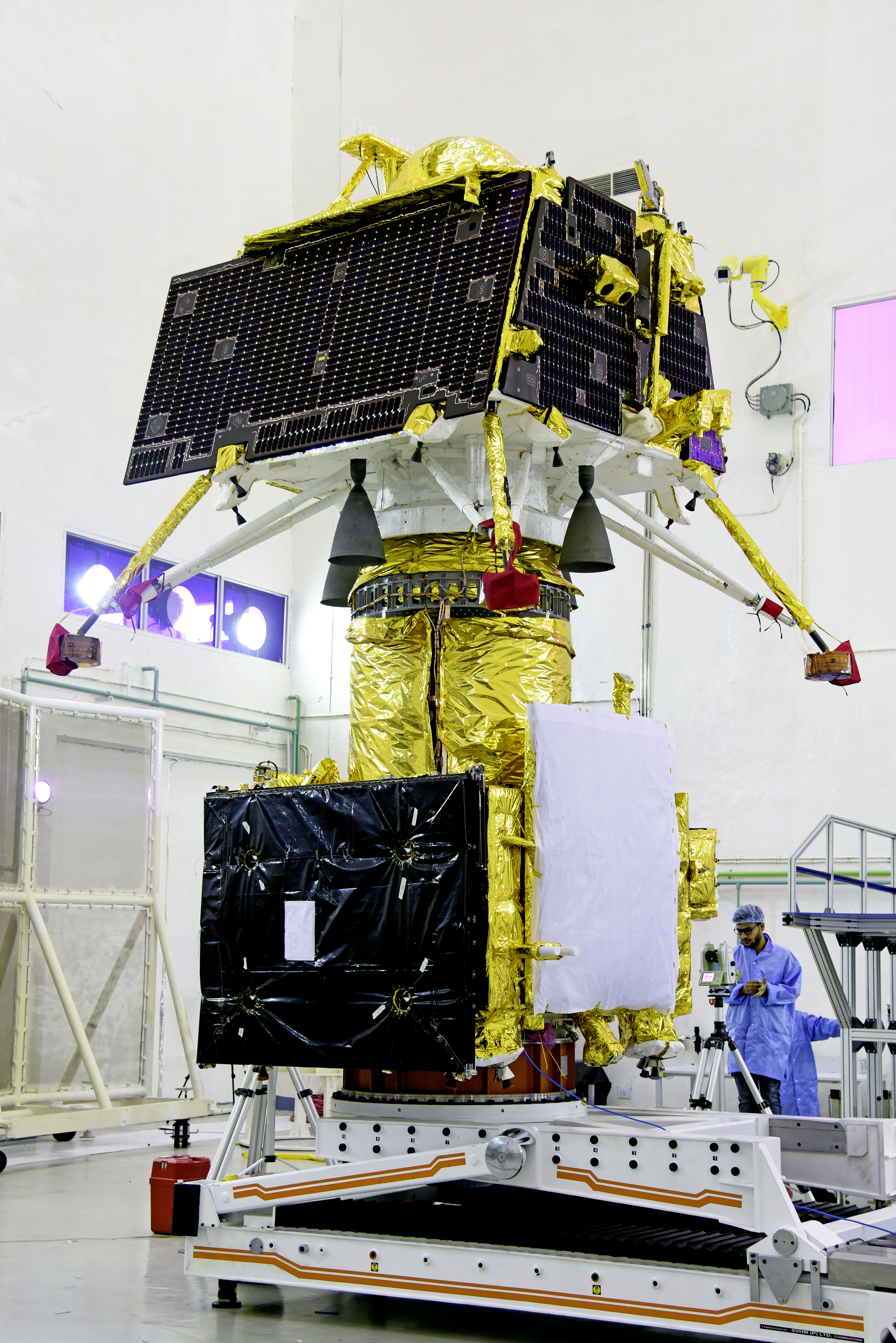
- Vikram lander mounted on top of orbiter inside cleanroom.
- Mission type: Orbiter; Lander; Rover
- Operator: ISRO
- COSPAR ID: 2019-042A
- SATCAT no.: 44441
- Website: www.isro.gov.in/Chandrayaan_2.html
- Mission duration: Orbiter: ~ 7.5 years (planned); 7 years, 3 months (elapsed); Vikram lander: ≤ 14 days (planned); 0 days (landing failure); Pragyan rover: ≤ 14 days (planned); 0 days (not deployed)

Spacecraft properties
- Manufacturer: ISRO
- Launch mass: Combined (wet): 3,850 kg (8,490 lb); Combined (dry): 1,308 kg (2,884 lb); Orbiter (wet): 2,379 kg (5,245 lb); Orbiter (dry): 682 kg (1,504 lb); Vikram lander (wet): 1,471 kg (3,243 lb); Vikram lander (dry): 626 kg (1,380 lb); Pragyan rover: 27 kg (60 lb)
- Power: Orbiter: 1000 watts Vikram lander: 650 watts Pragyan rover: 50 watts

Start of mission
- Launch date: 22 July 2019, 09:13:12 UTC
- Rocket: GSLV Mk III M1
- Launch site: Satish Dhawan Space Centre
- Contractor: ISRO

Lunar orbiter
- Orbital insertion: 20 August 2019, 03:32 UTC

Orbital parameters
- Periselene altitude: 100 km (62 mi)
- Aposelene altitude: 100 km (62 mi)

Lunar lander
- Spacecraft component: Rover
- Landing date: 6 September 2019, 20:23 UTC
- Landing site: near-Lunar south pole (intended); Tiranga Point 70.8810°S 22.7840°E (between Manzinus C and Simpelius N craters) (crash site)
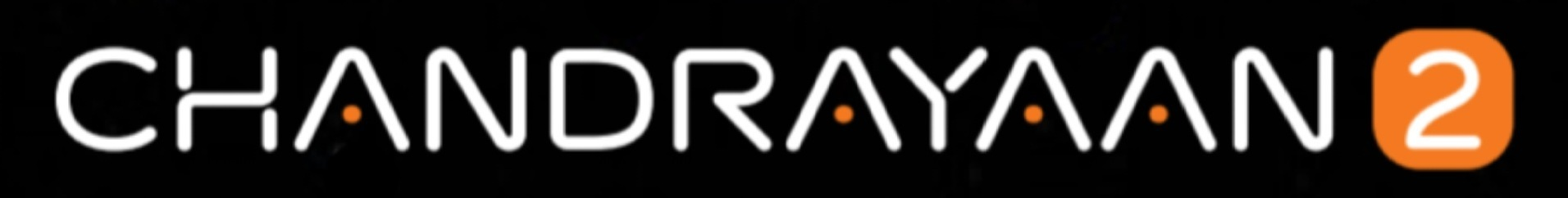
- Mission Insignia Chandrayaan programme

Chandrayaan-2 (from Sanskrit: Chandra, "Moon" and yāna, "craft, vehicle") is the second lunar exploration mission developed by ISRO after Chandrayaan-1. It consists of a lunar orbiter, the Vikram lunar lander, and the Pragyan rover, all of which were developed in India. The main scientific objective is to map and study the variations in lunar surface composition, as well as the location and abundance of lunar water.

The spacecraft was launched from the second launch pad at the Satish Dhawan Space Centre in Andhra Pradesh on 22 July 2019 at 09:13:12 UTC by a LVM3-M1 rocket. The craft reached lunar orbit on 20 August 2019. The Vikram lander crashed due to a software error as it attempted a lunar landing on 6 September 2019.

The lunar orbiter continues to operate in orbit around the Moon. A follow-up landing mission, Chandrayaan-3, was launched in 2023 and successfully performed a lunar landing.

== History ==
On 12 November 2007, representatives of the Roscosmos and ISRO signed an agreement for the two agencies to work together on the Chandrayaan-1's follow-up project, Chandrayaan-2. ISRO would have the prime responsibility for the orbiter, rover and the launch by GSLV, while Roscosmos was to provide the lander. The Indian government approved the mission in a meeting of the Union Cabinet, held on 18 September 2008 and chaired by Prime Minister Manmohan Singh. The design of the spacecraft was completed in August 2009, with scientists of both countries conducting a joint review.

Although ISRO finalised the payload for Chandrayaan-2 on schedule, the mission was postponed in January 2013 and rescheduled to 2016 because Russia was unable to develop the lander on time. In 2012, there was a delay in the construction of the Russian lander for Chandrayaan-2 due to the failure of the Fobos-Grunt mission to Mars, since the technical issues connected with the Fobos-Grunt mission which were also used in the lunar projects including the lander for Chandrayaan-2 needed to be reviewed. The changes proposed by Roscosmos necessitated increase in lander mass and required ISRO to decrease mass of its rover and accept some reliability risk. When Russia cited its inability to provide the lander even by a revised timeframe of 2015 due to technical and financial reasons, India decided to develop the lunar mission independently. With new mission timeline for Chandrayaan-2 and an opportunity for a Mars mission arising with launch window in 2013, unused Chandrayaan-2 orbiter hardware was repurposed to be used for the Mars Orbiter Mission.

Chandrayaan-2 launch had been scheduled for March 2018 initially, but was first delayed to April and then to October 2018 to conduct further tests on the vehicle. On 19 June 2018, after the program's fourth Comprehensive Technical Review meeting, a number of changes in configuration and landing sequence were planned for implementation which increased the gross lift-off mass of spacecraft from 3,250 kg to 3,850 kg. Initially an uprated GSLV Mk II was the chosen launch vehicle for Chandrayaan-2 but this increased spacecraft mass and issues with launch vehicle upratement forced the launch vehicle to be switched to a more capable LVM3. Issues with engine throttling were found during testing, pushing the launch to the early 2019. Two of the lander's legs experienced minor damage during one of the tests in February 2019, delaying the launch even further.

Chandrayaan-2 launch was scheduled for 14 July 2019, 21:21 UTC (15 July 2019 at 02:51 IST local time), with the landing expected on 6 September 2019. However, the launch was aborted due to a technical glitch and was rescheduled. The launch occurred on 22 July 2019 at 09:13:12 UTC (14:43:12 IST) on the first operational flight of a GSLV MK III M1.

On 6 September 2019, the lander during its landing phase, deviated from its intended trajectory starting at 2.1 km (1.3 mi) altitude, and had lost communication when touchdown confirmation was expected. Initial reports suggesting a crash were confirmed by ISRO chairman K. Sivan, stating that "it must have been a hard landing". The Failure Analysis Committee concluded that the crash was caused by a software glitch. Unlike ISRO's previous record, the report of the Failure Analysis Committee has not been made public. However, just days before the Chandrayaan 3 launch, the then ISRO chief S Somanath noted on the sidelines of the India Space Congress that the primary issues were the higher thrust by the 5 engines used to reduce the velocity, the artificial limit which restricted the craft to a maximum of 10 degrees change per second, and the small landing area.

== Objectives ==
The primary objectives of the Chandrayaan-2 lander were to illustrate the ability to soft-land and operate a robotic rover on the lunar surface.

The scientific goals of the orbiter are

- to study lunar topography, mineralogy, elemental abundance, the lunar exosphere, and signatures of hydroxyl and water ice;
- to study the water ice in the south polar region and thickness of the lunar regolith on the surface; and
- to map the lunar surface and help to prepare 3D maps of it.

== Design ==
The name Chandrayaan means "mooncraft" in Sanskrit and most other Indian languages. The mission was launched on a GSLV Mk III M1 with an approximate lift-off mass of 3,850 kg (8,490 lb) from Satish Dhawan Space Centre on Sriharikota Island of Andhra Pradesh. As of June 2019, the mission has an allocated cost of ₹ 9.78 billion (approximately US$141 million which includes ₹ 6 billion for the space segment and ₹ 3.75 billion as launch costs on GSLV Mk III M1. Chandrayaan-2 stack was initially put in an Earth parking orbit of 170 km (110 mi) perigee and 40,400 km (25,100 mi) apogee by the launch vehicle.

=== Orbiter ===
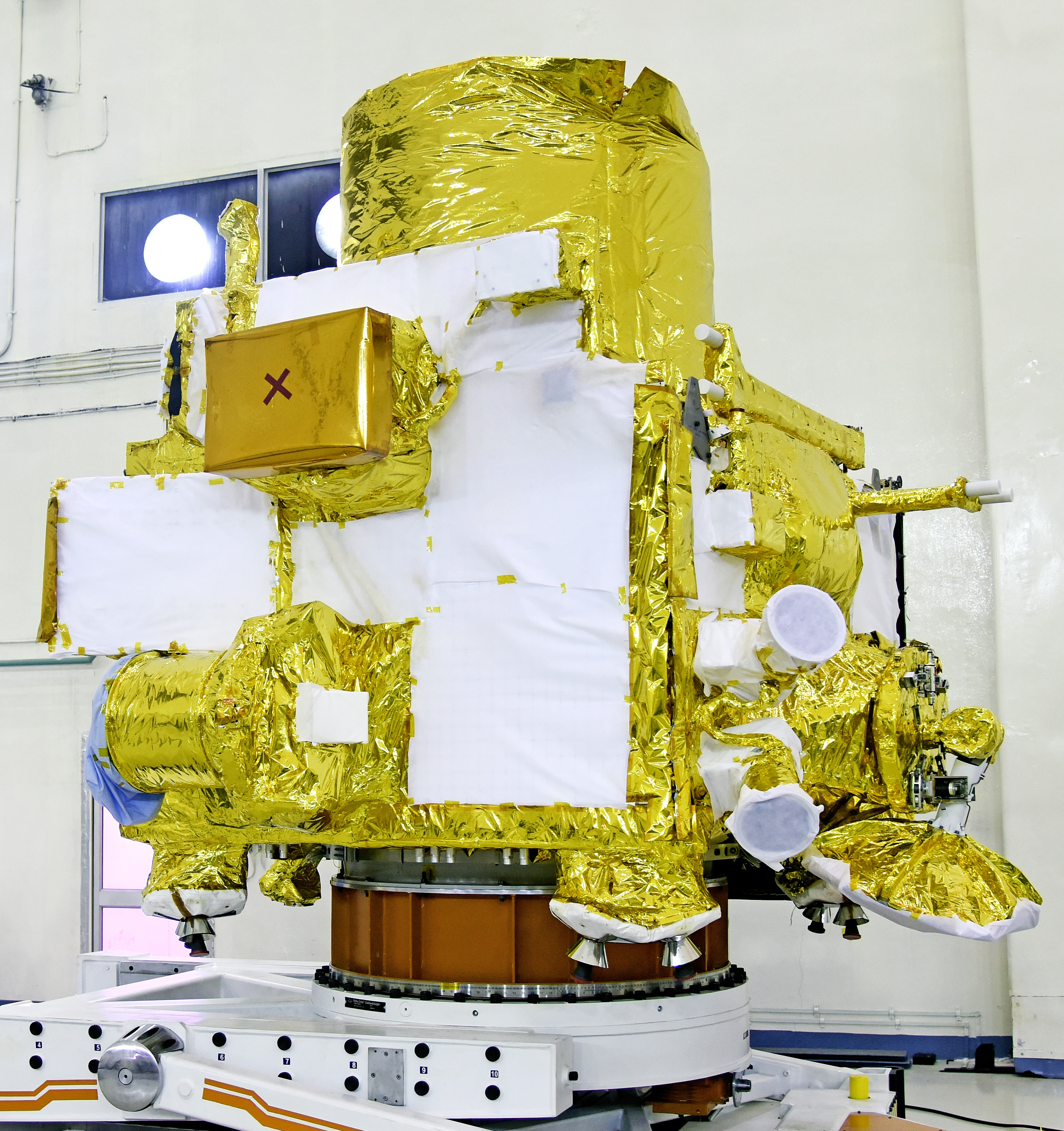
Chandrayaan-2 orbiter at integration facility

The Chandrayaan-2 orbiter is orbiting the Moon on a polar orbit at an altitude of 100 km (62 mi). It carries eight scientific instruments; two of which are improved versions of those flown on Chandrayaan-1. The approximate launch mass was 2,379 kg (5,245 lb). The Orbiter High Resolution Camera (OHRC) conducted high-resolution observations of the landing site prior to separation of the lander from the orbiter. The orbiter's structure was manufactured by Hindustan Aeronautics Limited and delivered to the ISRO Satellite Centre on 22 June 2015.

- Dimensions: 3.2 × 5.8 × 2.2 m
- Gross lift-off mass: 2,379 kg (5,245 lb)
- Propellant mass: 1,697 kg (3,741 lb)
- Dry mass: 682 kg (1,504 lb)
- Power generation capacity: 1000 watts
- Mission duration: ~ 7.5 years, extended from the planned 1 year owing to the precise launch and mission management, in lunar orbit

=== Vikram lander ===
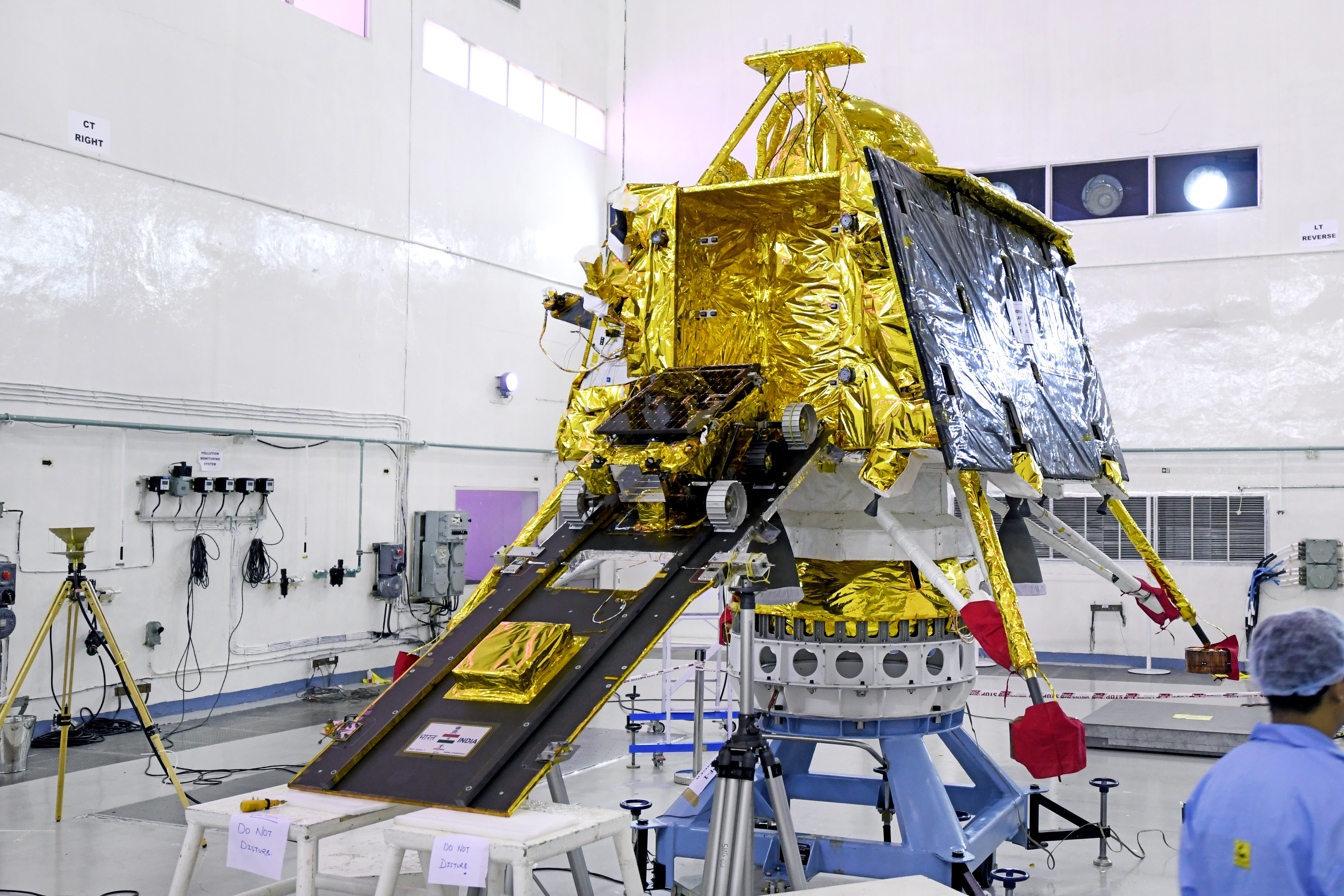
Rover Pragyan mounted on the ramp of Vikram lander

Images of the Earth captured by Chandrayaan-2 Vikram lander camera LI4

The mission's lander is called Vikram (Sanskrit: विक्रम, romanized: Vikrama, lit. 'Valour') named after cosmic ray scientist Vikram Sarabhai (1919–1971), who is widely regarded as the founder of the Indian space programme. The Vikram lander detached from the orbiter and descended to a low lunar orbit of 30 km × 100 km (19 mi × 62 mi) using its 800 N (180 lb_{f}) liquid main engines. After checking all of its on-board systems it attempted a soft landing that would have deployed the rover, and performed scientific activities for approximately 14 Earth days. Vikram crash-landed during this attempt. The combined mass of the lander and rover was approximately 1,471 kg (3,243 lb).

The preliminary configuration study of the lander was completed in 2013 by the Space Applications Centre (SAC) in Ahmedabad. The lander's propulsion system consisted of eight 58 N (13 lb_{f}) thrusters for attitude control and five 800 N (180 lb_{f}) liquid main engines derived from ISRO's 440 N (99 lb_{f}) liquid apogee motor. Initially, the lander design employed four main throttle-able liquid engines, but a centrally mounted fixed-thrust engine was added to handle new requirements of having to orbit the Moon before landing. The additional engine was expected to mitigate upward draft of lunar dust during the soft landing. The four throttle-able engines of lander were capable of throttling between range of 40 to 100 percent incrementally in steps of 20%. Vikram was designed to safely land on slopes up to 12°.

Some associated technologies include:

- A high resolution camera, Laser Altimeter (LASA)
- Lander Hazard Detection Avoidance Camera (LHDAC)
- Lander Position Detection Camera (LPDC)
- Lander Horizontal Velocity Camera (LHVC)
- 800 N throttleable liquid main engine
- Attitude thrusters
- Ka-band radio altimeters
- Laser Inertial Reference and Accelerometer Package (LIRAP) and the software needed to run these components.

Engineering models of the lander began undergoing ground and aerial tests in late October 2016, in Challakere in the Chitradurga district of Karnataka. ISRO created roughly 10 craters on the surface to help assess the ability of the lander's sensors to select a landing site.

- Dimensions: 2.54 m × 2 m × 1.2 m (8 ft 4 in × 6 ft 7 in × 3 ft 11 in)
- Gross lift-off mass: 1,471 kg (3,243 lb)
- Propellant mass: 845 kg (1,863 lb)
- Dry mass: 626 kg (1,380 lb)
- Power generation capability: 650 watts
- Mission duration: ≤14 days (one lunar day)

=== Pragyan rover ===
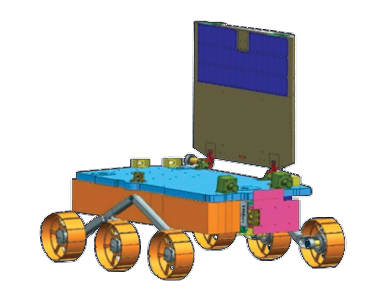
Pragyan rover of the Chandrayaan-2 mission

The mission's rover was called Pragyan (Sanskrit: Prajñāna, lit. 'Wisdom')) with a mass of 27 kg (60 lb), and would have operated on solar power. The rover was to move on six wheels, traversing 500 m (1,600 ft) on the lunar surface at the rate of 1 cm (0.39 in) per second, perform on-site analyses and send the data to the lander, which would have relayed it to the Mission Control on the Earth.

For navigation, the rover would have used :

- Stereoscopic Camera-based 3D Vision : Two 1 megapixel, monochromatic navcams in front of the rover to provide the ground control team a 3D view of the surrounding terrain, and help in path-planning by generating a digital elevation model of the terrain. IIT Kanpur contributed to the development of the subsystems for light-based map generation and motion planning for the rover.
- Control and Motor Dynamics : The rover has a rocker-bogie suspension system and six wheels, each driven by independent brushless DC electric motors. Steering is accomplished by differential speed of the wheels or skid steering.

The expected operating time of Pragyan rover was one lunar day, or ~14 Earth days, as its electronics were not designed to endure the frigid lunar night. However, its power system has a solar-powered sleep/wake-up cycle implemented, which could have resulted in longer service time than planned. Two aft wheels of the rover had the ISRO logo and the State Emblem of India embossed on them to leave behind patterned tracks on the lunar surface.

- Dimensions: 0.9 by 0.75 by 0.85 metres (2 ft 11 in × 2 ft 6 in × 2 ft 9 in)
- Power: 50 watts
- Travel speed: 1 centimetre per second (0.39 in/s)
- Mission duration: ~14 Earth days (one lunar day)

=== Telemetry, tracking, and command (TT&C) ===
During various phases of launch and spacecraft operations of Chandrayaan-2 mission, the TT&C support was provided by ISRO Telemetry, Tracking and Command Network (ISTRAC), Indian Deep Space Network (IDSN), NASA Deep Space Network and National Institute for Space Research's (INPE) ground stations located in Alcântara and Cuiabá.

== Science payload ==
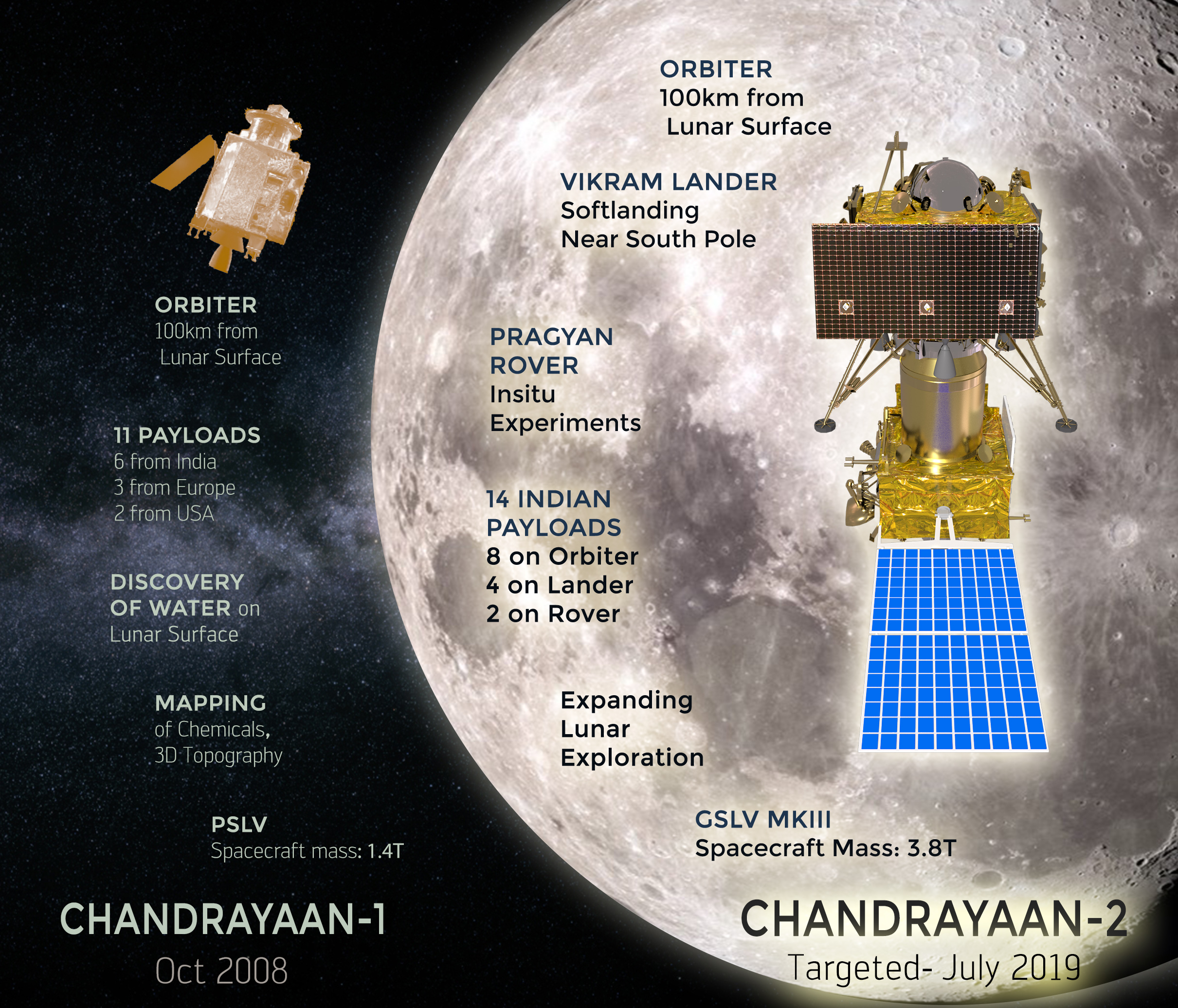
Mission overview

ISRO selected eight scientific instruments for the orbiter, four for the lander, and two for the rover. While it was initially reported that NASA and European Space Agency (ESA) would participate in the mission by providing some scientific instruments for the orbiter, ISRO in 2010 had clarified that due to weight restrictions it will not be carrying foreign payloads on the mission. However, in an update a month before launch, an agreement between NASA and ISRO was signed to include a small laser retroreflector from NASA to the lander's payload to measure the distance between the satellites above and the microreflector on the lunar surface.

=== Orbiter ===
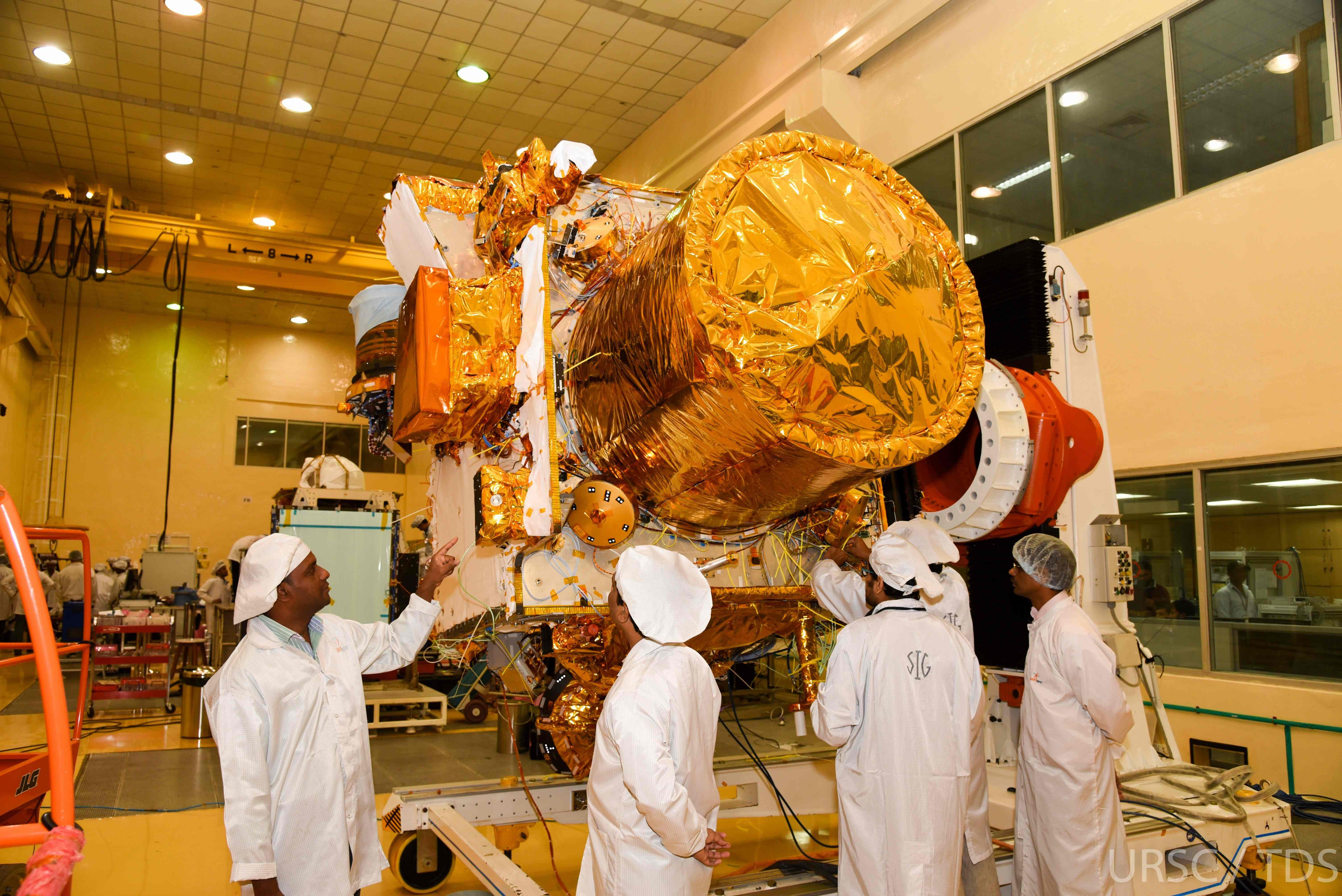
Chandrayaan-2 orbiter in clean-room being integrated with payloads

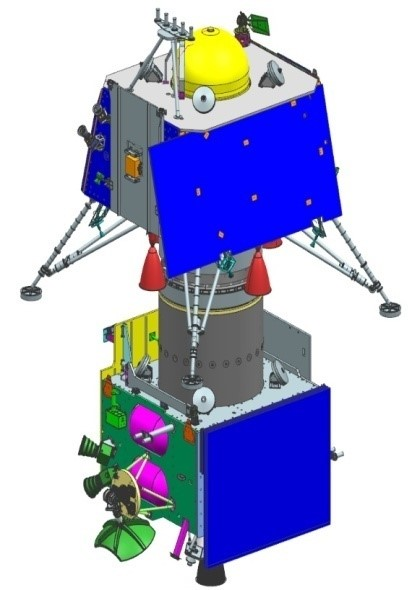
Chandrayaan-2 composite

The orbiter has several scientific payloads.

- The Chandrayaan-2 Large Area Soft X-ray Spectrometer (CLASS) from the ISRO Satellite Centre (ISAC), which makes use of X-ray fluorescence spectra to determine the elemental composition of the lunar surface.
- The Solar X-ray monitor (XSM) from Physical Research Laboratory (PRL), Ahmedabad, primarily supports CLASS instrument by providing solar X-ray spectra and intensity measurements as input to it. Additionally these measurements will help in studying various high-energy processes occurring in the solar corona.
- The Dual Frequency L-band and S-band Synthetic Aperture Radar (DFSAR) from the Space Applications Centre (SAC) for probing the first few metres of the lunar surface for the presence of different constituents. DFSAR is expected to provide further evidence confirming the presence of water ice, and its distribution below the shadowed regions of the Moon. It has lunar surface penetration depth of 5 m (16 ft) (L-band).
- The Imaging IR Spectrometer (IIRS) from the SAC for mapping of lunar surface over a wide wavelength range for the study of minerals, water molecules and hydroxyl present. It features an extended spectral range (0.8 μm to 5 μm), an improvement over previous lunar missions whose payloads worked up to 3 μm.
- The Chandrayaan-2 Atmospheric Compositional Explorer 2 (ChACE-2) Quadrupole Mass Analyzer from Space Physics Laboratory (SPL), designed for carry out a detailed study of the lunar exosphere.
- The Terrain Mapping Camera-2 (TMC-2) from SAC for preparing a three-dimensional map essential for studying the lunar mineralogy and geology
- The Radio Anatomy of Moon Bound Hypersensitive Ionosphere and Atmosphere – Dual Frequency Radio Science experiment (RAMBHA-DFRS) by SPL for the studying electron density in the lunar ionosphere
- The Orbiter High Resolution Camera (OHRC) by SAC for scouting a hazard-free spot prior to landing. Used to help prepare high-resolution topographic maps and digital elevation models of the lunar surface. OHRC has a spatial resolution of 0.32 m (1 ft 1 in) from 100 km (62 mi) polar orbit, which is the best resolution among any lunar orbiter mission to date.

=== Vikram lander ===
The payloads on the Vikram lander were:

- Instrument for Lunar Seismic Activity (ILSA) MEMS based seismometer by LEOS for studying Moon-quakes near the landing site
- Chandra's Surface Thermo-physical Experiment (ChaSTE) thermal probe jointly developed by SPL, Vikram Sarabhai Space Centre (VSSC) and Physical Research Laboratory (PRL), Ahmedabad for estimating the thermal properties of the lunar surface
- RAMBHA-LP Langmuir probe by SPL, VSSC for measuring the density and variation of lunar surface plasma
- A laser retroreflector array (LRA) by the Goddard Space Flight Center for taking precise measurements of distance between the reflector on the lunar surface and satellites in lunar orbit. The microreflector weighed about 22 g (0.78 oz) and cannot be used for taking observations from Earth-based lunar laser stations.

=== Pragyan rover ===
Pragyan rover carried two instruments to determine the abundance of elements near the landing site:

- Laser induced Breakdown Spectroscope (LIBS) from the laboratory for Electro Optic Systems (LEOS), Bangalore
- Alpha Particle Induced X-ray Spectroscope (APXS) from PRL, Ahmedabad
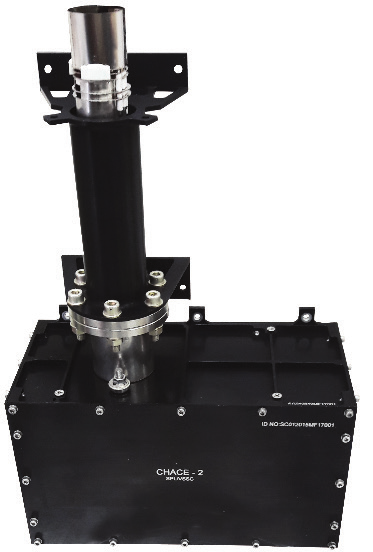
CHACE2

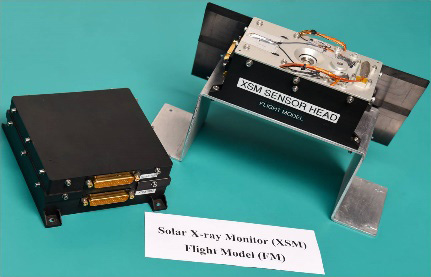
XSM

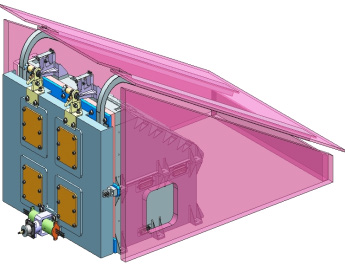
CLASS

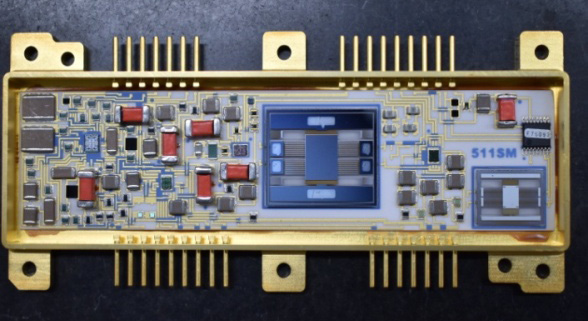
ILSA MEMS sensor package

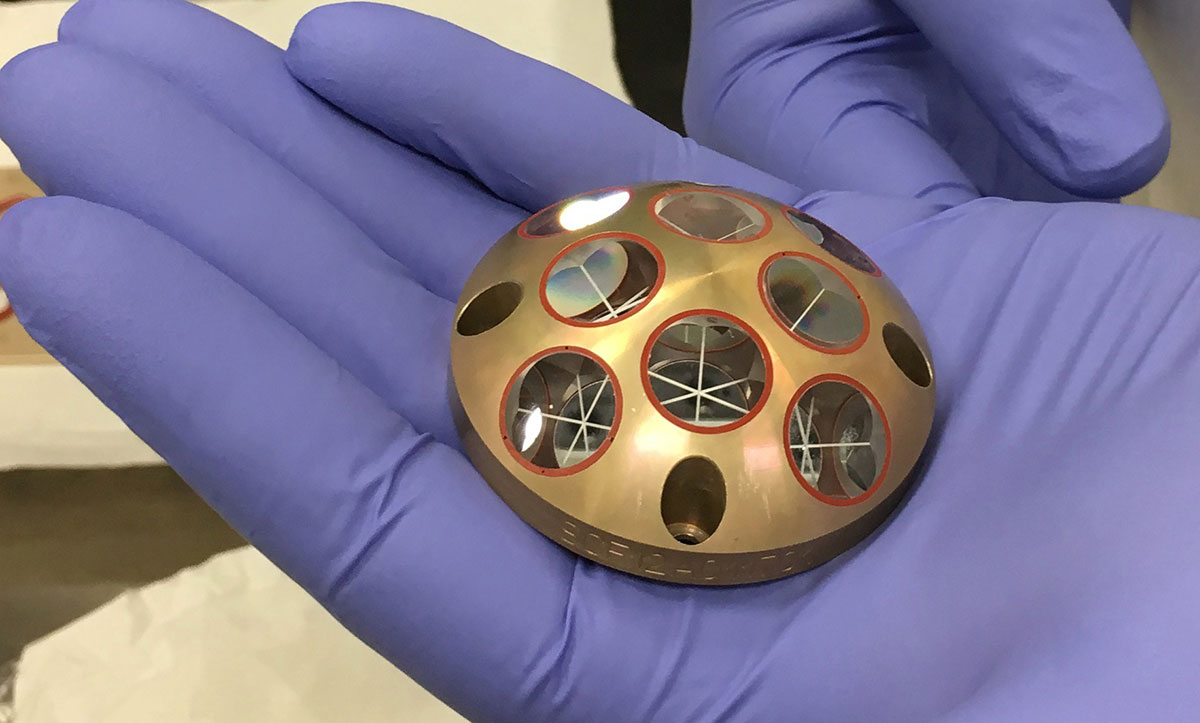
Laser retroreflector array (LRA)

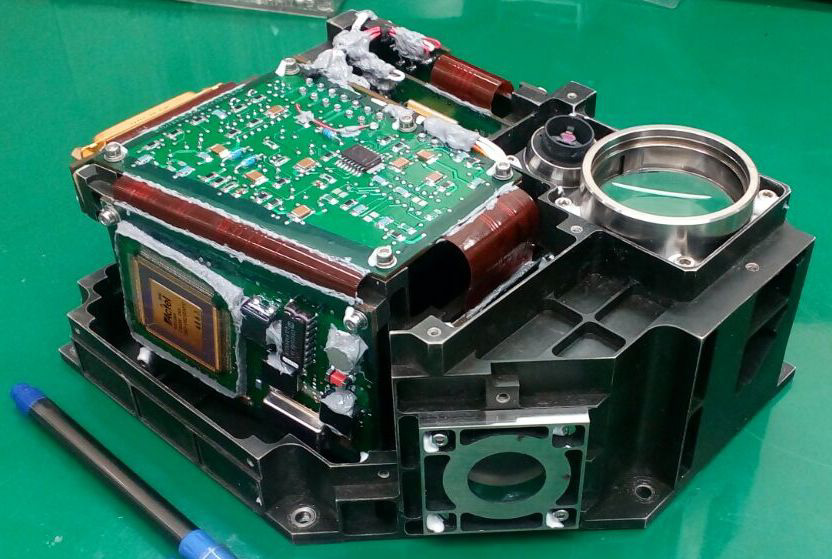
LIBS

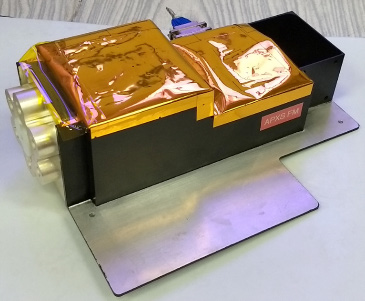
APXS

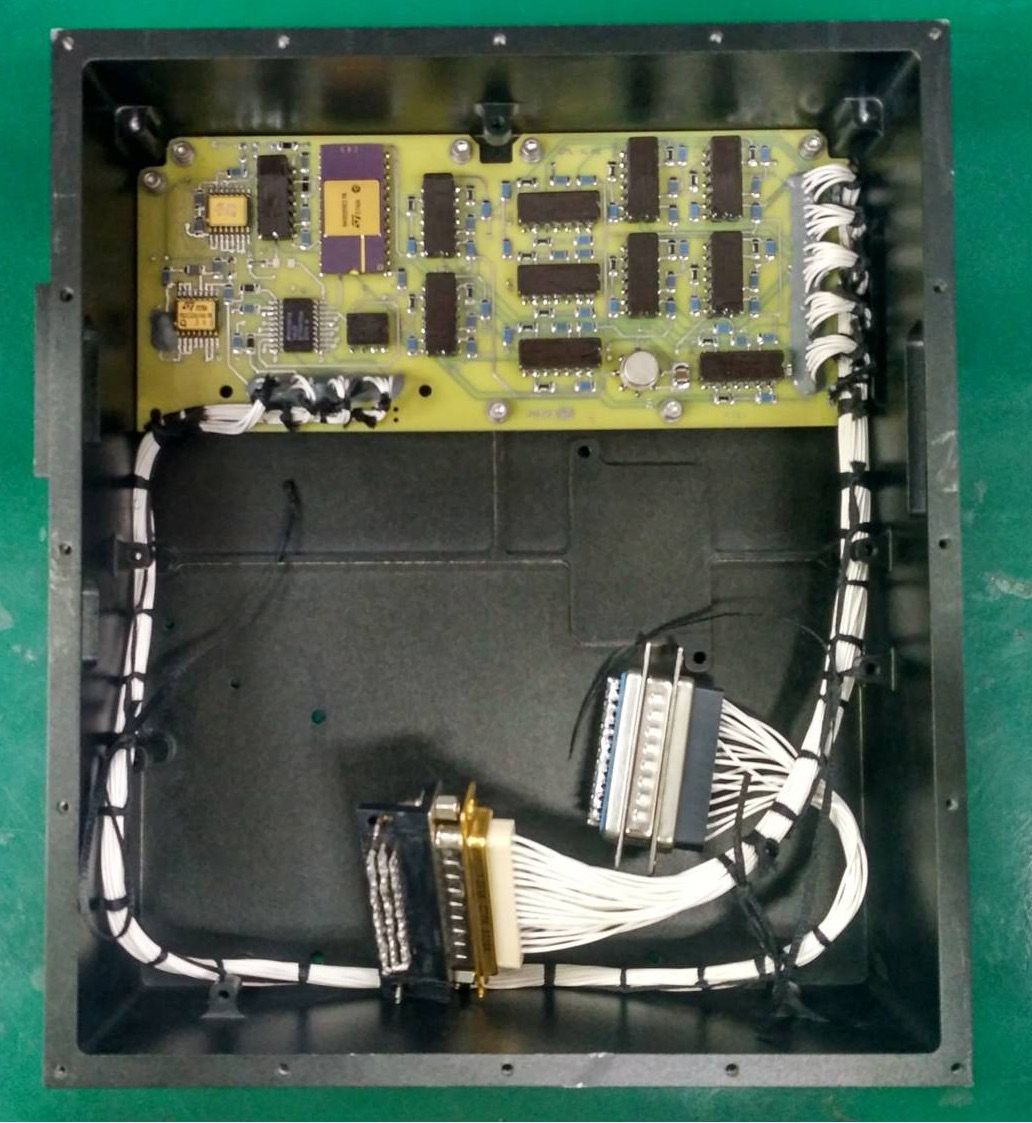
ChaSTE

== Mission profile ==
Animation of Chandrayaan-2

Geocentric phase

Selenocentric phase

Lunar landing phase

Overall motion of Chandrayaan-2

Earth · Moon · Chandrayaan-2

=== Launch ===
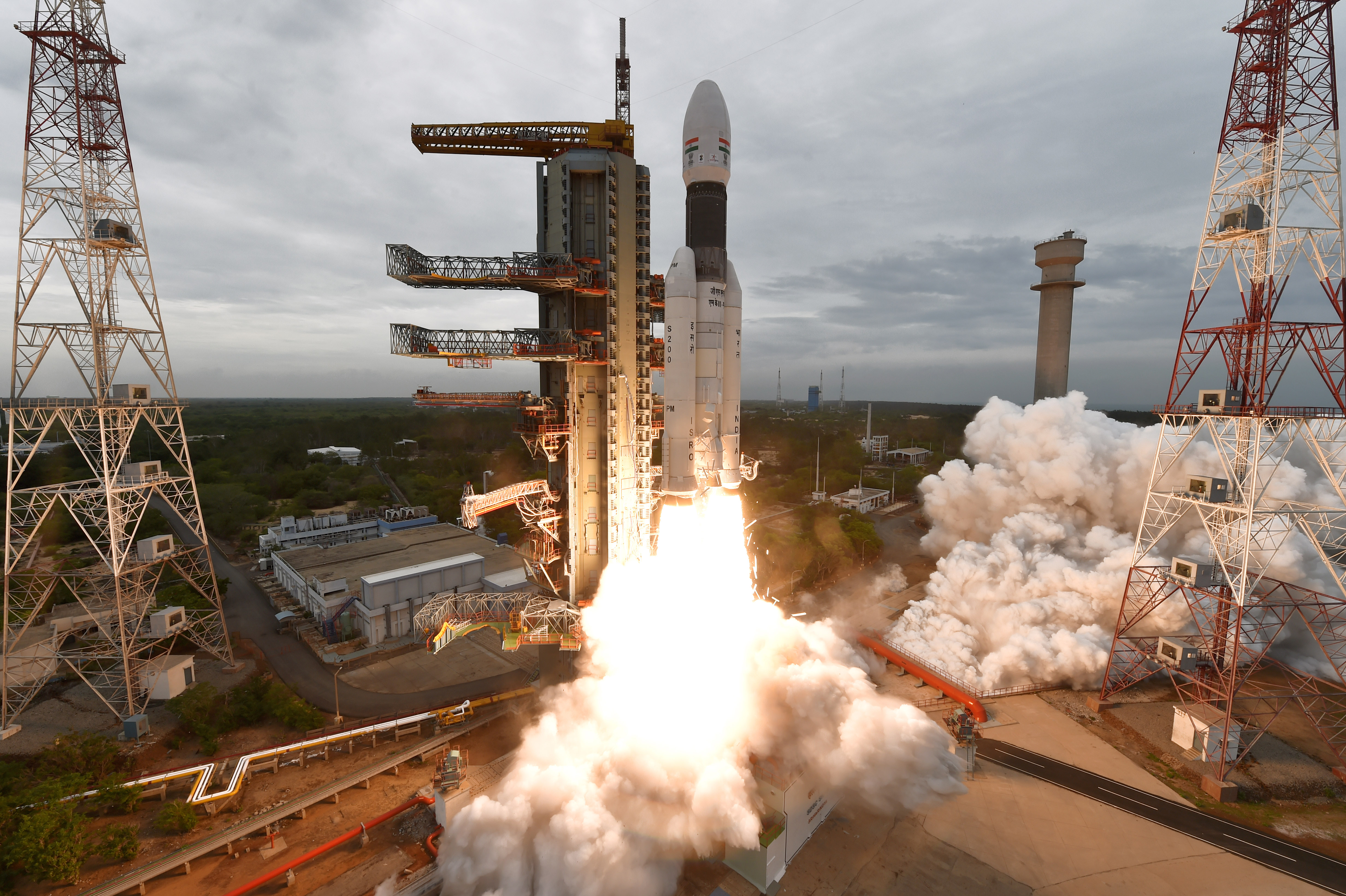
Chandrayaan-2 lifting off on 22 July 2019 at 02.43 PM IST

The launch of Chandrayaan-2 was initially scheduled for 14 July 2019, 21:21 UTC (15 July 2019 at 02:51 IST local time). However, the launch was aborted 56 minutes and 24 seconds before launch due to a technical glitch, so it was rescheduled to 22 July 2019. Unconfirmed reports later cited a leak in the nipple joint of a helium gas bottle as the cause of cancellation.

Finally Chandrayaan-2 was launched on board the LVM3 M1 launch vehicle on 22 July 2019 at 09:13:12 UTC (14:43:12 IST) with a better-than-expected apogee as a result of the cryogenic upper stage being burned to depletion, which later eliminated the need for one of the apogee-raising burns during the geocentric phase of mission. This also resulted in the saving of around 40 kg fuel on board the spacecraft.

Immediately after launch, multiple observations of a slow-moving bright object over Australia were made, which could be related to upper stage venting of residual LOX / LH2 propellant after the main burn.

=== Geocentric phase ===
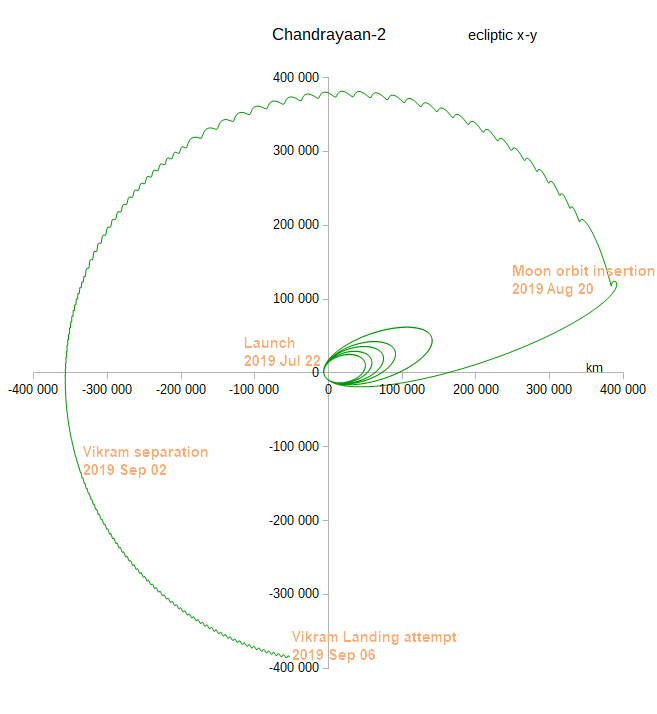
Chandrayaan-2's trajectory

After being placed into a 45,475 × 169 km parking orbit by the launch vehicle, the Chandrayaan-2 spacecraft stack gradually raised its orbit using on-board propulsion over 22 days. In this phase, one perigee-raising and five apogee-raising burns were performed to reach a highly eccentric orbit of 142,975 × 276 km followed by trans-lunar injection on 13 August 2019. Such a long Earth-bound phase with multiple orbit-raising manoeuvres exploiting the Oberth effect was required because of the limited lifting capacity of the launch vehicle and thrust of the spacecraft's on-board propulsion system. A similar strategy was used for Chandrayaan-1 and the Mars Orbiter Mission during their Earth-bound phase trajectory. On 3 August 2019, the first set of Earth images were captured by the LI4 camera on the Vikram lander, showing the North American landmass.

=== Selenocentric phase ===
After 29 days from its launch, the Chandrayaan-2 spacecraft stack entered lunar orbit on 20 August 2019 after performing a lunar orbit insertion burn for 28 minutes 57 seconds. The three-spacecraft stack was placed into an elliptical orbit that passed over the polar regions of the Moon, with 18,072 km (11,229 mi) aposelene and 114 km (71 mi) periselene. By 1 September 2019, this elliptical orbit was made nearly circular with 127 km (79 mi) aposelene and 119 km (74 mi) periselene after four orbit-lowering manoeuvres followed by separation of Vikram lander from the orbiter on 07:45 UTC, 2 September 2019.

=== Planned landing site ===
Landing site	Coordinates
Prime landing site	70.90267°S 22.78110°E
Alternate landing site	67.87406°S 18.46947°W

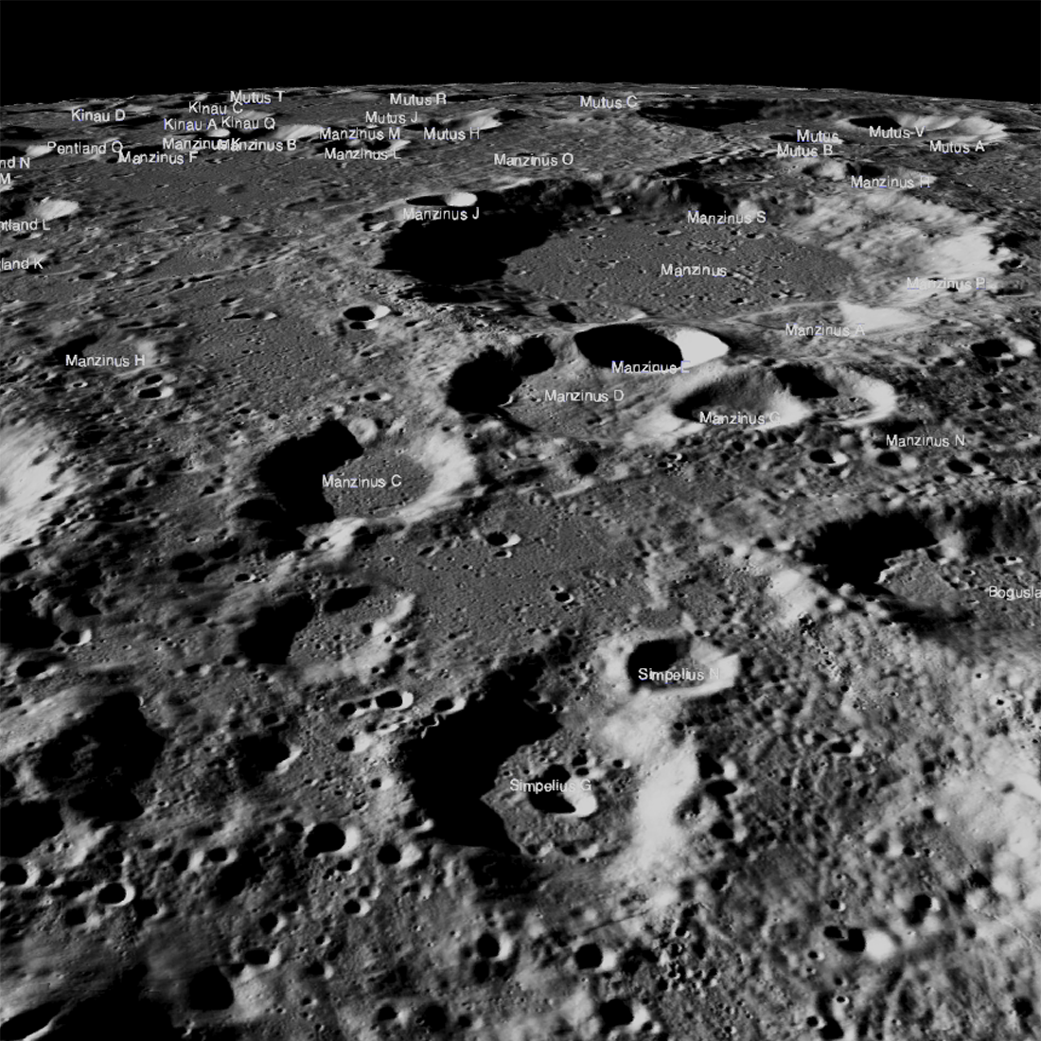
The flat highland between craters Manzinus C and Simpelius N was the planned landing zone for the Vikram lander.

Two landing sites were selected, each with an ellipse of 32 km × 11 km (19.9 mi × 6.8 mi). The prime landing site (PLS54) was at 70.90267°S 22.78110°E (600 km (370 mi) from the south pole,) and the alternate landing site (ALS01) was at 67.87406° South 18.46947° West. The prime site was on a high plain between the craters Manzinus C and Simpelius N, on the near side of the Moon.

=== Failed landing attempt ===
Location of the Vikram lander impact site

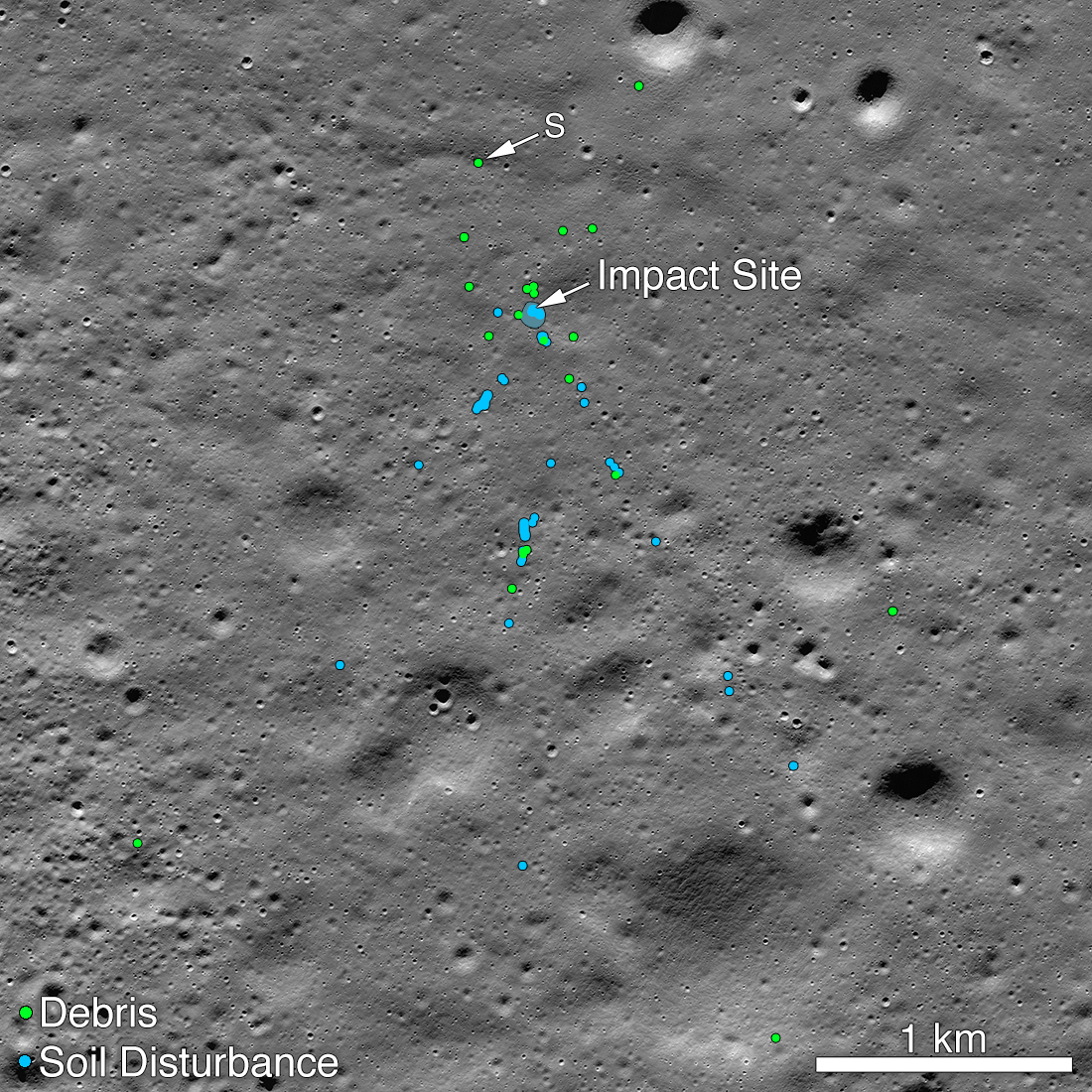
Ejecta field around Vikram lander impact site

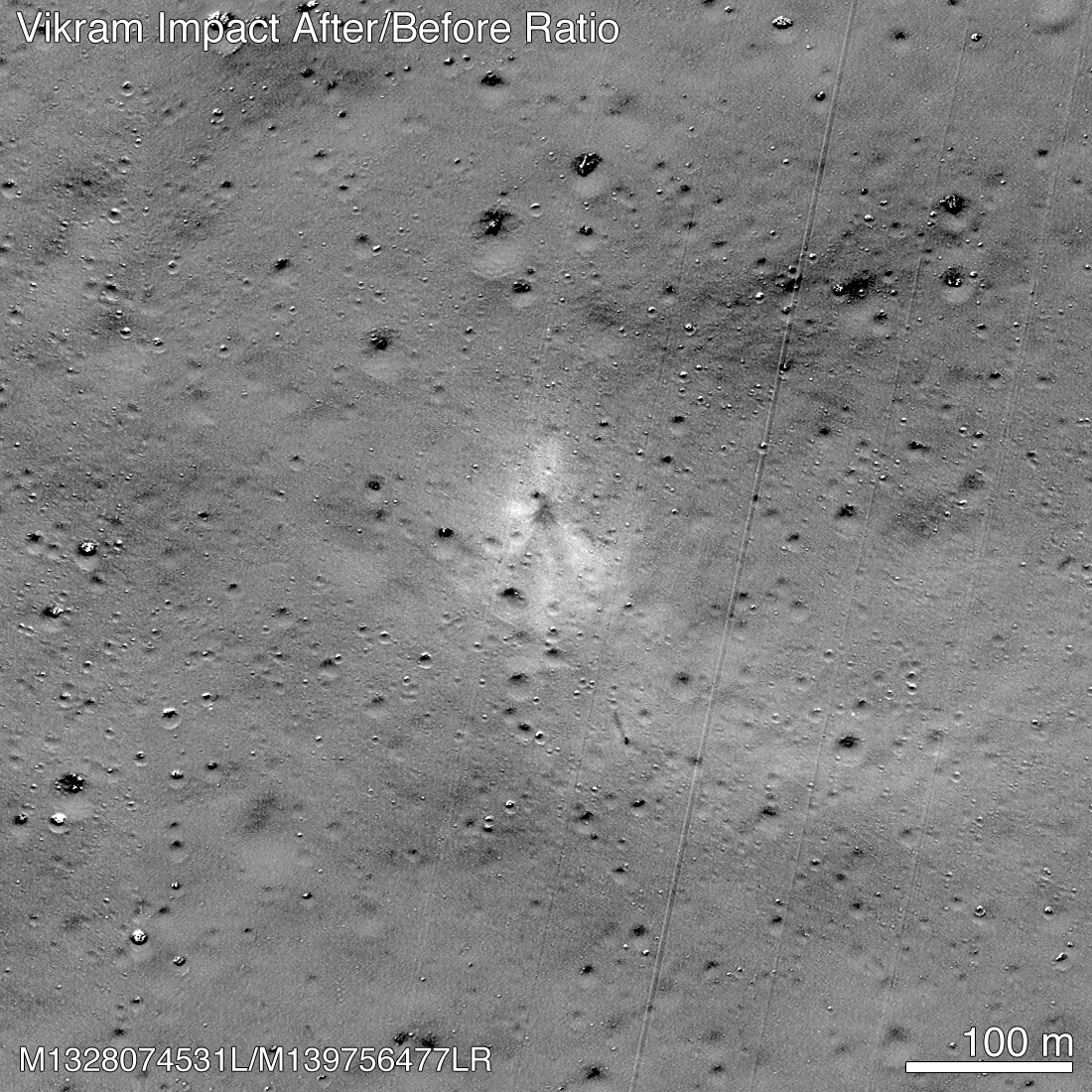
Before and after images of the impact site

Before and after images of the impact site

Vikram began its descent at 20:08:03 UTC, 6 September 2019 and was scheduled to land on the Moon at around 20:23 UTC. The descent and soft-landing were to be performed by the on-board computers on Vikram, with mission control unable to make corrections. The initial descent was considered within mission parameters, passing critical braking procedures as expected, but the lander's trajectory began to deviate at about 2.1 km (1.3 mi) above the surface. Telemetry readings during ISRO's live-stream show that Vikram's final vertical velocity was 58 m/s (210 km/h) at 330 m (1,080 ft) above the surface, which a number of experts noted, would have been too fast for the lunar lander to make a successful landing. Initial reports suggesting a crash were confirmed by ISRO chairman K. Sivan, stating that "it must have been a hard landing". However, it contradicted initial claims from anonymous ISRO officials that the lander was intact and lying in a tilted position.

Both ISRO and NASA attempted to communicate with the lander for about two weeks before the lunar night set in, while NASA's LRO flew over on 17 September 2019 and acquired some images of the intended landing zone. However, the region was near dusk, causing poor lighting for optical imaging. NASA's LRO images, showing no sight of the lander, were released on 26 September 2019. The LRO flew over again on 14 October 2019 under more favourable lighting conditions, but was unable to locate it. The LRO performed a third flyover on 10 November 2019.

On 16 November 2019, the Failure Analysis Committee released its report to the Space Commission, concluding that the crash was caused by a software glitch. Phase One of the descent, the Rough Braking Phase, from an altitude of 30 km to 7.4 km above the Moon's surface went as intended with velocity being reduced from 1683 m/s to 146 m/s (6058 to 525 km/h). Anomalous deviation in performance began 693.8 seconds into powered descent after the end of the first phase and with the beginning of the Absolute Navigation Phase (also known as Camera Coasting Phase) where the lander's orientation is deliberately kept fixed. It was found that the lander's main engines had slightly higher thrust of 422 N (95 lb_{f}) than nominal at 360 N (81 lb_{f}), so during this phase the lander slowed down more than it should have. The thrust control algorithm was configured to apply corrections towards the end of the phase and not instantaneously, allowing large navigation errors to be accumulated. After the end of Camera Coasting Phase, the rate of correction application was limited due to built in safety constraints. For instance, the maximum rate at which attitude could change was constrained. Other contributing issues were the coarse throttling of main engines, a polarity related software error, wrong computation of remaining time of flight by onboard algorithm, and the rigid requirement to land inside the planned 500×500 meter landing site regardless of non-nominal flight status. Subsequently, Vikram lander ended up increasing its horizontal velocity by (48 m/s) to reach the landing site while descending at (50 m/s), causing Vikram to land hard, impacting relatively close to the intended landing site. The complete official report has not been made public.

Vikram's impact site was located at 70.8810°S 22.7840°E by the LROC team after receiving helpful input from Shanmuga Subramanian, a volunteer from Chennai, Tamil Nadu, who located debris from the spacecraft in pictures released by NASA. While initially estimated to be within 500 m (1,600 ft) of the intended landing site, best-guess estimates from satellite imagery indicate initial impact about 600 m away. The spacecraft shattered upon impact, with debris scattered over almost two dozen locations in an area spanning kilometers. The crash site was later named Tiranga Point.

Timeline of operations
Phase	Date	Event	Detail	Result		References
Phase	Date	Event	Detail	Apogee / Aposelene	Perigee / Periselene	References
Geocentric phase	22 July 2019, 09:13:12 UTC	Launch	Burn time: 16 min 14 sec	45,475 km (28,257 mi)	169.7 km (105.4 mi)	
Geocentric phase	24 July 2019, 09:22 UTC	1st orbit-raising manoeuvre	Burn time: 48 seconds	45,163 km (28,063 mi)	230 km (140 mi)	
Geocentric phase	25 July 2019, 19:38 UTC	2nd orbit-raising manoeuvre	Burn time: 883 seconds	54,829 km (34,069 mi)	251 km (156 mi)	
Geocentric phase	29 July 2019, 09:42 UTC	3rd orbit-raising manoeuvre	Burn time: 989 seconds	71,792 km (44,609 mi)	276 km (171.5 mi)	
Geocentric phase	2 August 2019, 09:57 UTC	4th orbit-raising manoeuvre	Burn time: 646 seconds	89,472 km (55,595 mi)	277 km (172 mi)	
Geocentric phase	6 August 2019, 09:34 UTC	5th orbit-raising manoeuvre	Burn time: 1041 seconds	142,975 km (88,841 mi)	276 km (171 mi)	
Geocentric phase	13 August 2019, 20:51 UTC	Trans-lunar injection	Burn time: 1203 seconds	—	—	
Selenocentric phase	20 August 2019, 03:32 UTC	Lunar orbit insertion 1st lunar bound manoeuvre	Burn time: 1738 seconds	18,072 km (11,229 mi)	114 km (71 mi)	
Selenocentric phase	21 August 2019, 07:20 UTC	2nd lunar bound manoeuvre	Burn time: 1228 seconds	4,412 km (2,741 mi)	118 km (73 mi)	
Selenocentric phase	28 August 2019, 03:34 UTC	3rd lunar bound manoeuvre	Burn time: 1190 seconds	1,412 km (877 mi)	179 km (111 mi)	
Selenocentric phase	30 August 2019, 12:48 UTC	4th lunar bound manoeuvre	Burn time: 1155 seconds	164 km (102 mi)	124 km (77 mi)	
Selenocentric phase	1 September 2019, 12:51 UTC	5th lunar bound manoeuvre	Burn time: 52 seconds	127 km (79 mi)	119 km (74 mi)	
Vikram lunar landing	2 September 2019, 07:45 UTC	Vikram separation	—	127 km (79 mi)	119 km (74 mi)	
Vikram lunar landing	3 September 2019 3:20 UTC	1st deorbit burn	Burn time: 4 seconds	128 km (80 mi)	104 km (65 mi)	
Vikram lunar landing	3 September 2019, 22:12 UTC	2nd deorbit burn	Burn time: 9 seconds	101 kilometres (63 mi)	35 km (22 mi)	
Vikram lunar landing	6 September 2019, 20:08 UTC	Powered descent	Burn time: 15 minutes	Landing (planned)	Landing (planned)	
Vikram lunar landing	6 September 2019, 20:23 UTC	Vikram landing	Trajectory deviation started at 2.1 km altitude, telemetry was lost seconds before touchdown.	Lost upon crash landing.		
Vikram lunar landing	7 September 2019, 00:00 UTC−01:00 UTC (planned)	Pragyan rover deployment	Lander failure, rover was not deployed.	—	—	

=== Aftermath of failed landing attempt ===
There was an outpouring of support for ISRO from various quarters in the aftermath of the crash landing of its lunar lander. However, prominent Indian news media also criticized ISRO's lack of transparency regarding the crash of the lander and its analysis of the crash. Indian media also noted that unlike ISRO's previous record, the report of the Failure Analysis Committee was not made public and RTI queries seeking it were denied by ISRO citing section 8(1) of the RTI Act. ISRO's lack of consistency regarding the explanation around the rover's crashing was criticized, with the organization providing no proof of its own positions until the efforts of NASA and a Chennai based volunteer located the crash site on the lunar surface. In the wake of the events surrounding Chandrayaan-2, former ISRO employees criticized unverified statements from chairman K Sivan and what they claimed is the top-down leadership and working culture of the organisation. S Somanath who succeeded K Sivan as ISRO Chairman also expressed his dissatisfaction at the lack of transparency around landing failure, and misleading representation of it.

=== Continuing mission ===
Despite the failed landing, the orbiter part of the mission, with eight scientific instruments, remains operational, and will continue its seven-year mission to study the Moon. Chandrayaan-2 orbiter performed a collision avoidance manoeuvre at 14:52 UTC on 18 October 2021 to avert possible conjunction with Lunar Reconnaissance Orbiter. Both spacecraft were expected to come dangerously close to each other on 20 October 2021 at 05:45 UTC over the Lunar north pole.

The Chandrayaan-2 Orbiter would later serve as a relay for Chandrayaan-3 which landed close to the crash site and accomplished the mission's goals. The orbiter also observed the Sun during a massive solar flare in May 2024 with the XSM and the CLASS instrument, in conjunction with XpoSAT and Aditya-L1. The CHACE-2 instrument also observed changes in the lunar exosphere during this time. It also performed another collision avoidance manoeuvre on 11 November 2024 to preclude another conjunction with LRO. The Chandrayaan-2 orbiter was reported to have performed 2 more CAMS, as well as sixteen orbit management maneuvers to promote better imaging and scientific research by the end of 2025. The Orbiter releases over 48TB of research data every year.

== Discoveries and results ==
The orbiter, which is still active, regularly conducts experiments on Lunar Atmospheric composition, trace elements, and more.

- The Chandrayaan-2 orbiter and the Mars Orbiter Mission orbiter conducted a joint series of Radio occultation measurements of each other's signals. This was used by mission scientists to analayse the lunar and solar wind plasma environments.
- Detection of sodium: In October 2023, the orbiter discovered an abundance of sodium on the Moon. The moon is shown to have a tail of Sodium atoms thousands of Kilometers long. Due to phenomena like photon stimulated desorption, solar wind sputtering, and meteorite impacts, sodium atoms gets knocked off the surface. Solar radiation pressure accelerates the sodium atoms away from the Sun, forming an elongated tail toward the antisolar direction. Using the large area X-raySpectrometer, CLASS, the probe has spotted and mapped sodium on the Moon.
- Hydroxyl and Water molecules: The Chandrayaan-1 probe had detected water on the Moon for the first time in early 2008. Upgraded instruments on the Chandrayaan-2 orbiter detected Water, as well as Hydroxyl ions on the Moon, August 2022. It distinguished between these two with the aid of IIRS (Imaging Infrared Spectrometer). Between 29 and 62 degrees north latitude, the probe detected the presence of these two molecules. Along with this, it also observed that the sunlit regions contain higher concentrations of these two.
- Distribution of Gas in Lunar Atmosphere: Chandra Atmospheric Composition Explorer-2, detected Argon-40 in Lunar exosphere. The distribution of Ar-40 has significant spatial heterogeneity. The NASA probe, LADEE, detected Argon near the Equatorial region, but Argon far from that, was detected for the first time. There are localised enhancements (termed as Argon bulge) over several regions including the KREEP (potassium (K), rare-earth elements, and phosphorus (P)) and South Pole Aitken terrain.
- Presence of Rare elements: Chandra's Large Area Soft X-ray Spectrometer (CLASS), detected magnesium, aluminium, silicon, calcium, titanium, iron etc. It also examined and detected minor elements – chromium and manganese, for the first time. The findings have paved the path for adding knowledge about the magmatic evolution of the Moon, its nebular conditions and much more.
- Solar X-ray Monitor (XSM), has witnessed a huge amount of microflares outside the active regions of the Sun for the first time.
- The DFSAR intstument has created multiple detailed data-sets on L-band radar mapping of the lunar poles. The DFSAR instrument studied the subsurface features of the Moon, detected signatures of the sub-surface water-ice, mapped lunar morphological features in the polar regions in high resolution. The DFSAR is also used by PRL to study doubly shadowed craters located inside permanently shadowed regions of the Moon. Using Radar polarimetry, PRL scientists determined the presence of subsurface ice beneath the floors of four doubly shadowed craters at the Lunar poles. The science teams also targeted Faustini crater for their analysis. A study by Gujarat University and ISRO combined archival data from the Mini-SAR instrument of Chandrayaan-1 and the DFSAR instrument to identify Subsurface water Ice in the Faustini crater.
- The TMC 2, which is conducting imaging of the Moon at a global scale, found interesting geologic signatures of lunar crustal shortening, and identification of volcanic domes. The OHRC, mapped Moon With a resolution of 25 cm at 100 km altitude.
- A study conducted using data from Chandrayaan-1 and Chandryaan-2 TMC instruments, as well as from the SELENE mission was used in 2025 to analyse the age of volcanoes in the moon's Mare Insularum region.
- ISRO used the DFSAR instrument to study irregular craters and mare patches on the moon in 2025.
- DFRS experiment, studied the ionosphere of the Moon, which is generated by the solar photo-ionisation of the neutral species of the lunar tenuous exosphere. The experiment showed that Moon's ionosphere has a plasma density of the order of 10^4 cm^3, in the wake region which is at least one order of magnitude more than that is present in the day side.
- An analysis of the S-band TTC radio signals from India's Chandrayaan-2 orbiter revealed that the Moon's ionosphere exhibits unexpectedly high electron densities (close to 100 times greater) when it enters the Earth's geomagnetic tail. Conducting the expirent by passing radio signals through the plasma layer of the moon, Scientists have proposed that the presence of remnant lunar crustal magnetic fields could be trapping plasma, preventing its diffusion, and leading to localized enhancements in electron density. Further observations were made by using two-way radio occultations with the moon and earth.
- A study by scientists from PRL and IISER in 2026 postulated that water ice deposits in the Moon's south polar regions, where craters remain in almost constant darkness and temperatures plunge below 160 °C are far more stable than previously believed, offering a major boost to future human exploration plans such as the planned Chandrayaan Human landing attempt and NASA's Artemis Program as this may have allowed water deposits to sit accumulated and undisturbed for prehaps billions of years. The study involved high-resolution orbital imagery and impact modelling from Chandrayaan-2 OHRC and Danuri's Shadowcam databases, with the research team mapping millions of tiny craters, ranging from one to 20 metres in size, across locations on the moon between 85° and 90° south latitude.The study found that small scale impact events were fairly uncommon in this region, with over 74% of permanently shadowed regions remaining largely undisturbed by such impacts.

== Scientists involved in the mission ==
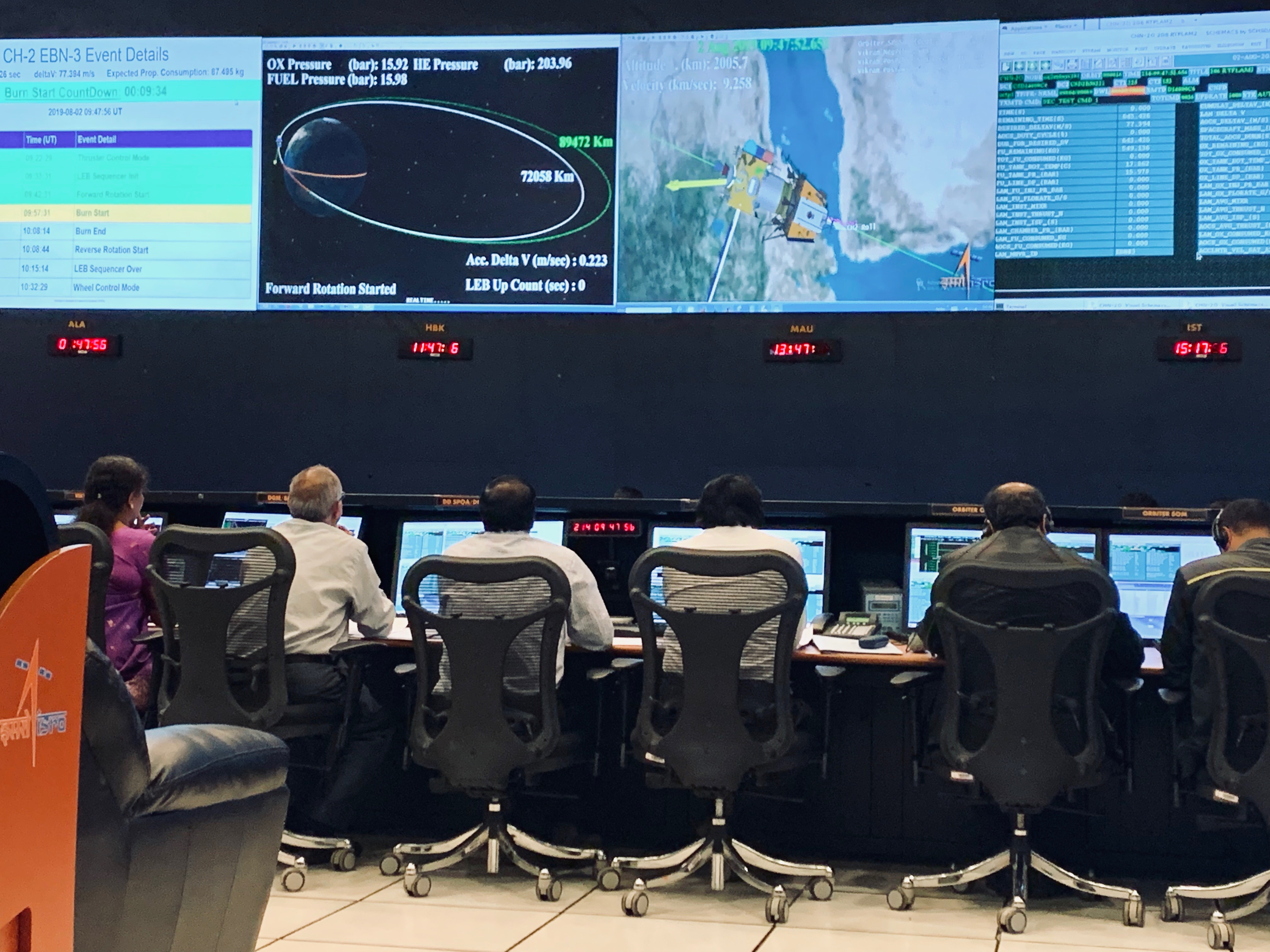
A view of Mission Operations Complex (MOX-1), ISTRAC prior to the fourth Earth-bound burn

Key scientists and engineers involved in the development of Chandrayaan-2 include:

- Ritu Karidhal – Mission Director
- Muthayya Vanitha – Project Director
- Kalpana Kalahasti – Associate Project Director
- G. Narayanan – Associate Project Director
- G. Nagesh – Project Director (former)
- Chandrakanta Kumar – Deputy Project Director (Radio-frequency systems)
- Amitabh Singh – Deputy Project Director (Optical Payload Data Processing, Space Applications Centre (SAC))

== Reattempt ==
In November 2019, ISRO officials stated that a new lunar lander mission was being studied and prepared. It was launched on 14 July 2023; with the designation Chandrayaan-3, which was a second attempt to demonstrate the landing capabilities needed for the Lunar Polar Exploration Mission proposed in partnership with Japan for 2025. The new mission was designed with a detachable propulsion module, also behaving like a communications relay satellite, a lander and a rover, but with no orbiter. S. Somanath, the VSSC director, announced that there would be more follow-up missions in the Chandrayaan programme.

In December 2019, it was reported that ISRO requested the initial funding of the project, amounting to ₹75 crore (US$8.0 million), of which ₹60 crore (US$6.4 million) is intended for machinery, equipment and other capital expenditure, while the remaining ₹15 crore (US$1.6 million) was sought under a revenue expenditure allowance. K. Sivan stated that its cost would be around ₹615 crore (equivalent to ₹790 crore or US$84 million in 2026). It performed a soft landing on the Moon on 23 August 2023.

== See also ==
- Beresheet lander – Concurrent lunar lander mission, crash-landed on the Moon
- Chandrayaan-3
- LUPEX
- Exploration of the Moon
- List of missions to the Moon
- List of ISRO missions
- Lunar resources
