= Schomberger (crater) =

Lunar surface depression

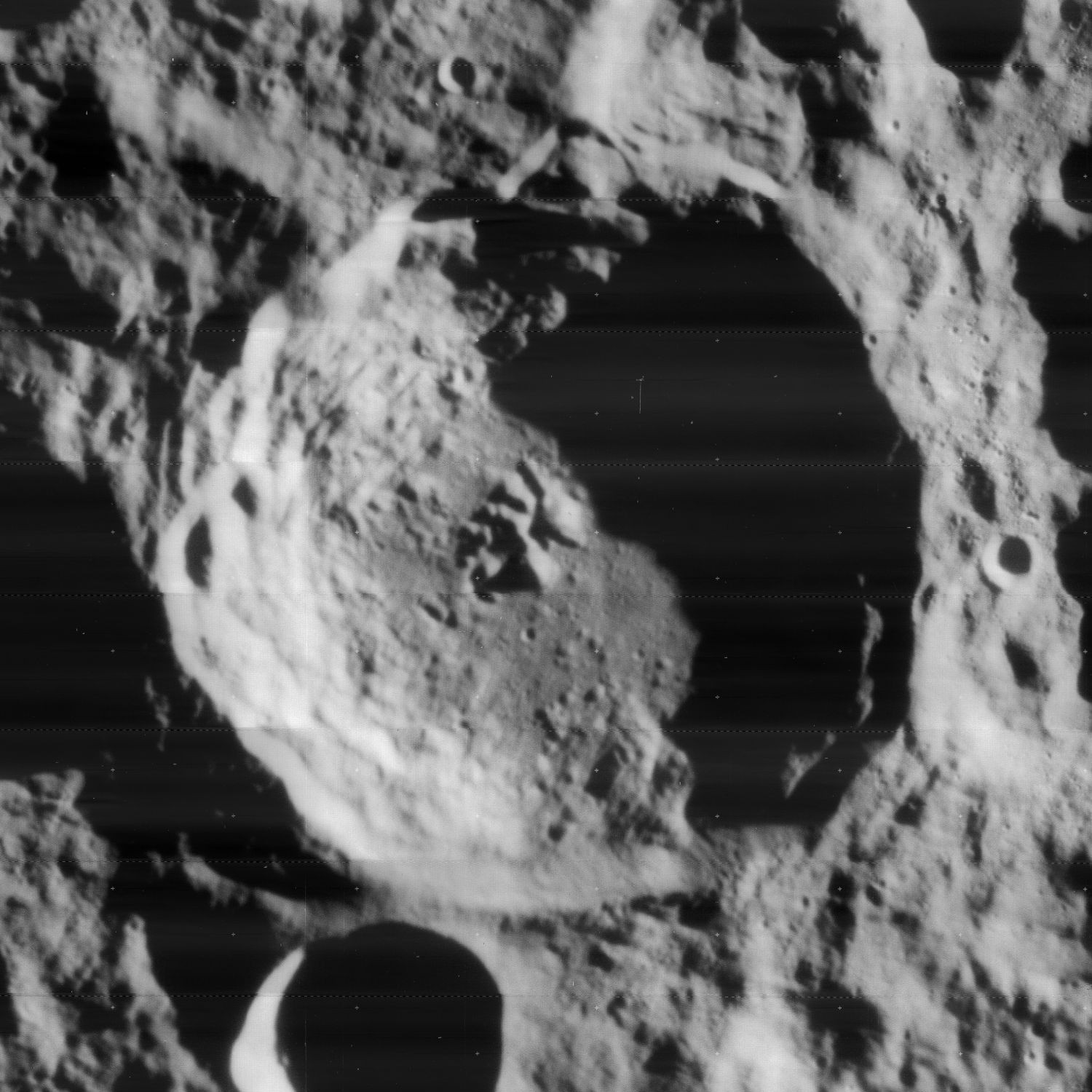
- Lunar Orbiter 4 image with north at top
- Coordinates: 76.7°S 24.9°E
- Diameter: 85 km
- Depth: 5.65 km (3.51 mi)
- Colongitude: 340° at sunrise
- Formation: Imbrian
- Eponym: Georg Schomberger

Schomberger is a prominent lunar impact crater that lies in the southern part of the Moon, in the area near the limb. It is located to the southwest of the crater Boguslawsky, and southeast of Simpelius. The relatively young satellite crater Schomberger A is nearly attached to the southern rim, and the much-aged Schomberger C lies just off the western rim.

On the lunar geologic timescale, this formation dates to the Imbrian period. This is a relatively well-defined crater with sharp features that have not been significantly worn down by minor impacts. The rim is roughly circular and sharp-edged, with a complex inner wall marked by slumping and many ridges and terraces. The inner floor is relatively flat and level, although somewhat rougher in the western half. At the midpoint of the interior is a central peak complex formed by several ridges.

This crater is named after Austrian astronomer and mathematician Georg Schomberger (c. 1597–1645).

== Satellite craters ==
By convention these features are identified on lunar maps by placing the letter on the side of the crater midpoint that is closest to Schomberger.

Schomberger	Latitude	Longitude	Diameter
A	78.8° S	24.4° E	31 km
C	77.2° S	15.7° E	43 km
D	73.5° S	24.6° E	24 km
F	80.1° S	20.8° E	11 km
G	77.1° S	7.7° E	17 km
H	77.4° S	4.0° E	17 km
J	78.8° S	19.6° E	9 km
K	79.7° S	14.3° E	9 km
L	80.6° S	17.5° E	17 km
X	75.2° S	34.9° E	8 km
Y	74.6° S	29.0° E	17 km
Z	73.5° S	27.3° E	5 km

Due to its ray system, Schomberger A is mapped as part of the Copernican System.
