= ISRO Telemetry, Tracking and Command Network =

Indian space research network

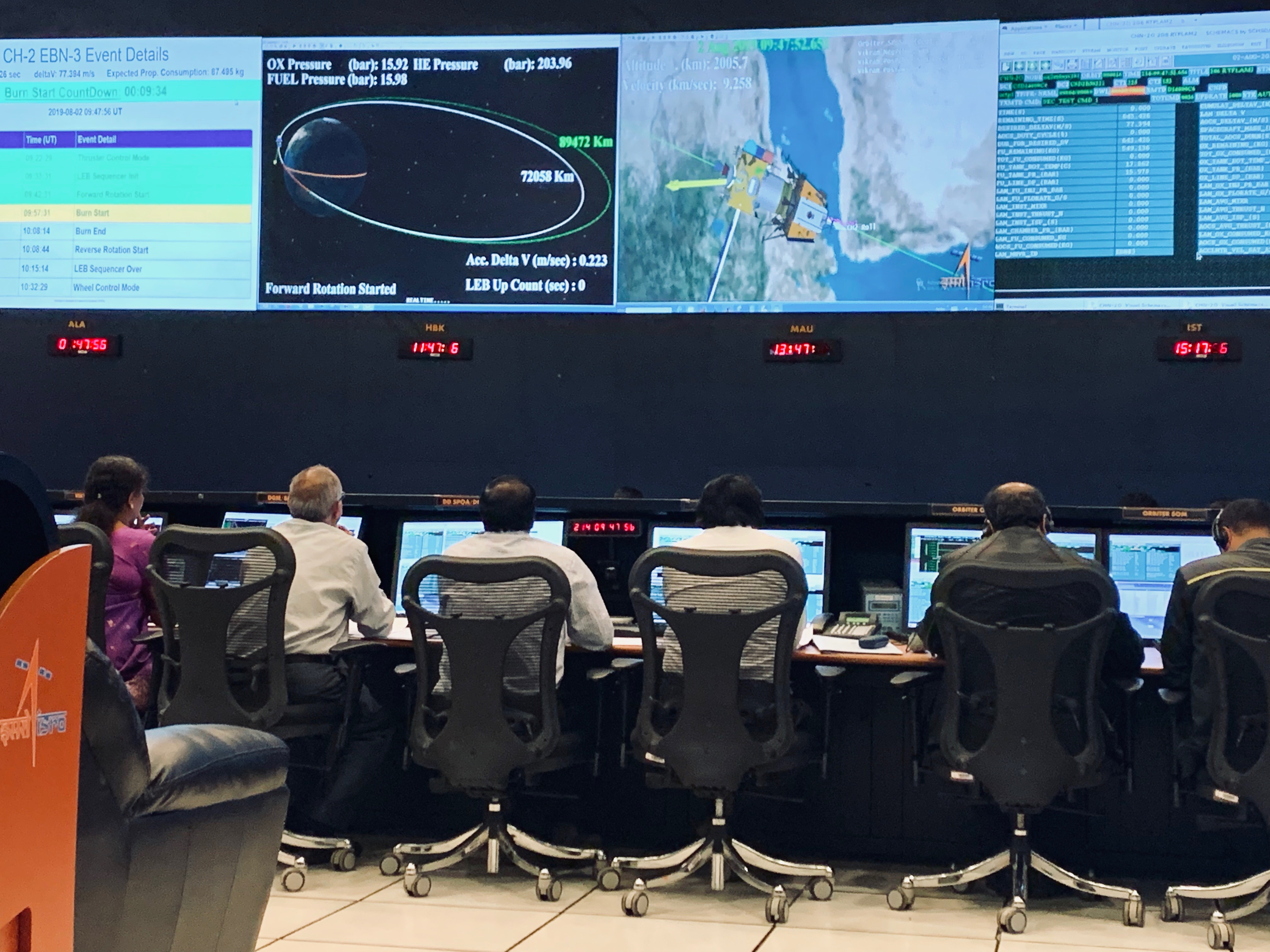
A view of Mission Operations Complex - 1 (MOX-1) at ISTRAC before commencement of an orbit raising burn for Chandrayaan-2.

The ISRO Telemetry, Tracking and Command Network (ISTRAC) is one of the ground segment arms of Indian Space Research Organisation and was established on September 06, 1976. It consists of a comprehensive global network of ground stations to provide telemetry, tracking and command (TTC) support to satellite and launch vehicle missions.

== Facilities ==
ISTRAC has several facilities as of November 2013:

- ISTRAC facilities in Bangalore consist of TTC ground station (BLR) with full redundancy multi-mission Spacecraft Control Center to carry out and control spacecraft operations and co-ordinate with the network stations. Computer facility with distributed architecture providing independent processors for communications handling, dedicated processors to provide real-time displays for individual spacecraft missions and off-line processors for carrying out spacecraft data archival, analysis and orbit determination.
- Communication Control facility to establish links between SCC and ISTRAC network stations as well as control centers of other participating external space agencies and data receptions stations through dedicated voice, data and TTY links.

== Mission ==
The mission of the ISTRAC includes:

- Tracking, commanding and housekeeping data acquisition as well as health analysis and control, orbit and attitude determination and network co-ordination support to all low Earth orbit satellite missions of ISRO throughout their mission life.
- Telemetry data acquisition support for ISRO launch vehicle missions from liftoff until satellite acquisition and down range tracking support for monitoring and determining the satellite injection parameters.
- Coordinating between spacecraft and launch vehicle teams, supporting ground stations right from planning till the completion of mission for the national and international satellite missions.
- Telemetry, tracking and command support for the International satellite launch projects.

== Ground Stations ==
ISTRAC has the following TTC ground stations:

=== India ===
- Hyderabad
- Bangalore, also hosts the Indian Spacecraft Control Centre
- Lucknow
- Sri Vijayapuram
- Sriharikota
- Thiruvananthapuram
- Bharti research station (AGEOS), Antarctica

=== Global Stations ===
- Port Louis, Mauritius
- Bear Lakes, Russia (Медвежьи Озера, Medvezhi Ozera), operating the RT-64 antenna
- Biak, Indonesia
- Brunei
- Svalbard, Norway
- Troll, Antarctica
- Vietnam
- Gatun Lake, Panama
- São Tomé and Príncipe, West Africa

== See also ==
- Indian Deep Space Network
- European Space Tracking
- NASA Deep Space Network
- Near Earth Network
- Space Network
