= Manzinus (crater) =

Crater on the Moon's near side

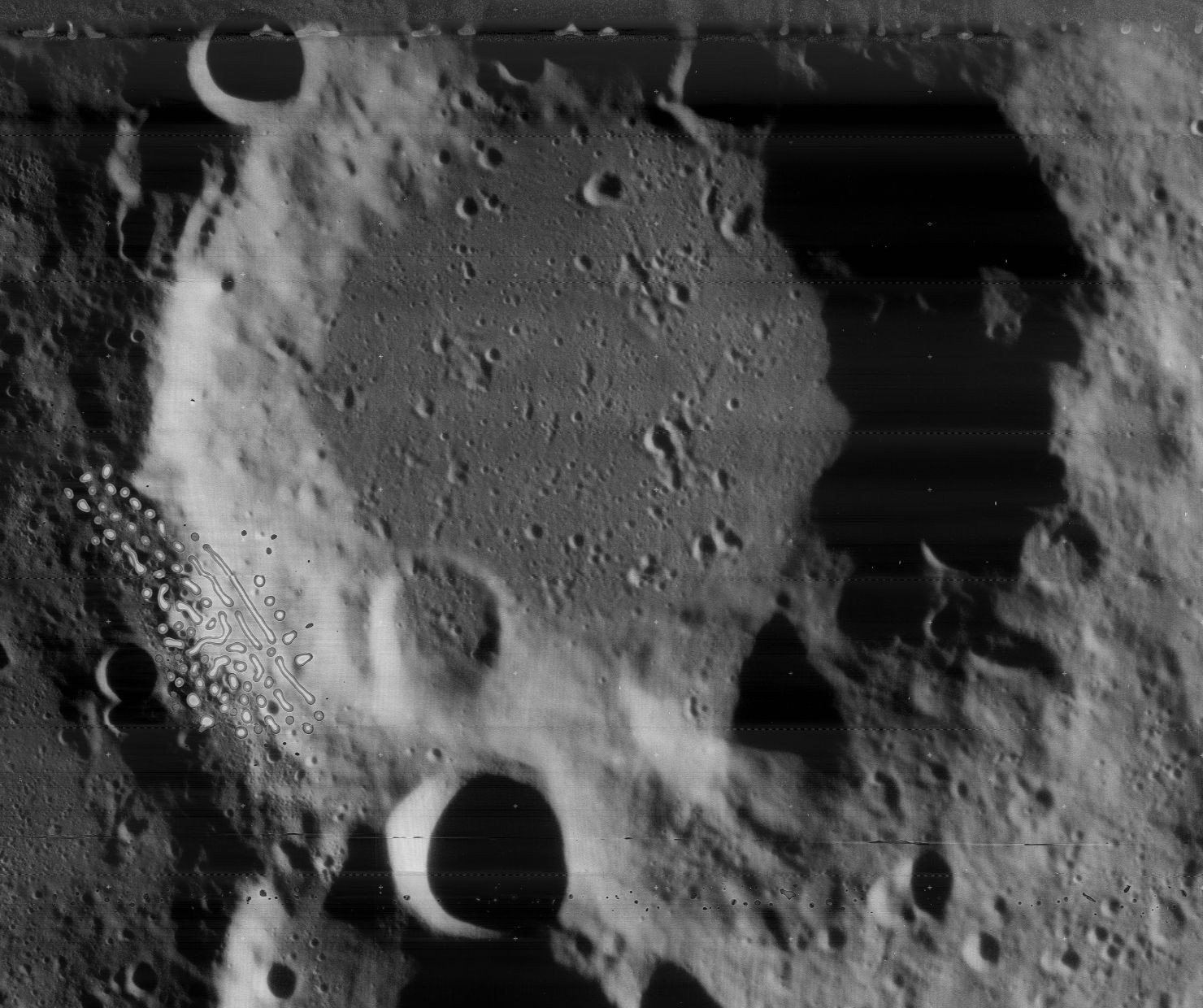
- Lunar Orbiter 4 image with north at top. (Group of dots in lower left is blemish on original image)
- Coordinates: 67.7°S 26.8°E
- Diameter: 98 km
- Depth: 3.8 km
- Colongitude: 337° at sunrise
- Formation: Pre-Nectarian
- Eponym: Carlo A. Manzini

Manzinus is a lunar impact crater that is located in the southern region of the Moon's near side. It lies less than one crater diameter to the south-southwest of the crater Mutus, and to the northwest of Boguslawsky. The latter is a crater with nearly the same dimension and a comparable appearance to Manzinus. On the lunar geologic timescale, this formation dates to the Pre-Nectarian period.

== Description ==
The outer rim of Manzinus is worn, eroded, and somewhat irregular. The outer rim to the north-northeast is joined to the smaller Manzinus R, and the crest along that side is lower and forms a saddle. There is a cluster of small craters along the southern side that partly overlap each other, consisting of the craters D, E, G, and N listed in the table below. The heavily eroded satellite crater Manzinus A lies along the southeastern inner wall. Similarly the small crater Manzinus S lies along the northern inner wall, and the cup-shaped Manzinus J overlies the northwest rim. The interior surface has been resurfaced in the past, and now forms a level, featureless plain that is marked only by a few tiny craterlets. The floor has the same albedo as the surrounding terrain.

== Exploration ==
In 2023, India's Chandrayaan-3 mission successfully landed near Manzinus U at 69.37 degrees south latitude and 32.35 degrees east longitude.

== Satellite craters ==
By convention these features are identified on lunar maps by placing the letter on the side of the crater midpoint that is closest to Manzinus.

Manzinus	Latitude	Longitude	Diameter
A	68.4° S	27.5° E	20 km
B	63.7° S	21.1° E	28 km
C	70.1° S	22.1° E	25 km
D	69.6° S	24.7° E	34 km
E	68.9° S	25.4° E	18 km
F	63.9° S	19.7° E	18 km
G	69.6° S	26.0° E	16 km
H	68.6° S	19.2° E	13 km
J	66.3° S	23.5° E	12 km
K	63.3° S	20.3° E	12 km
L	64.4° S	22.7° E	20 km
M	63.4° S	22.8° E	6 km
N	70.2° S	28.8° E	14 km
O	64.9° S	25.0° E	5 km
P	67.8° S	29.4° E	6 km
R	65.9° S	30.0° E	16 km
S	66.4° S	27.3° E	11 km
T	67.5° S	32.9° E	21 km
U	68.6° S	34.5° E	21 km
