= Simpelius (crater) =

Lunar surface depression

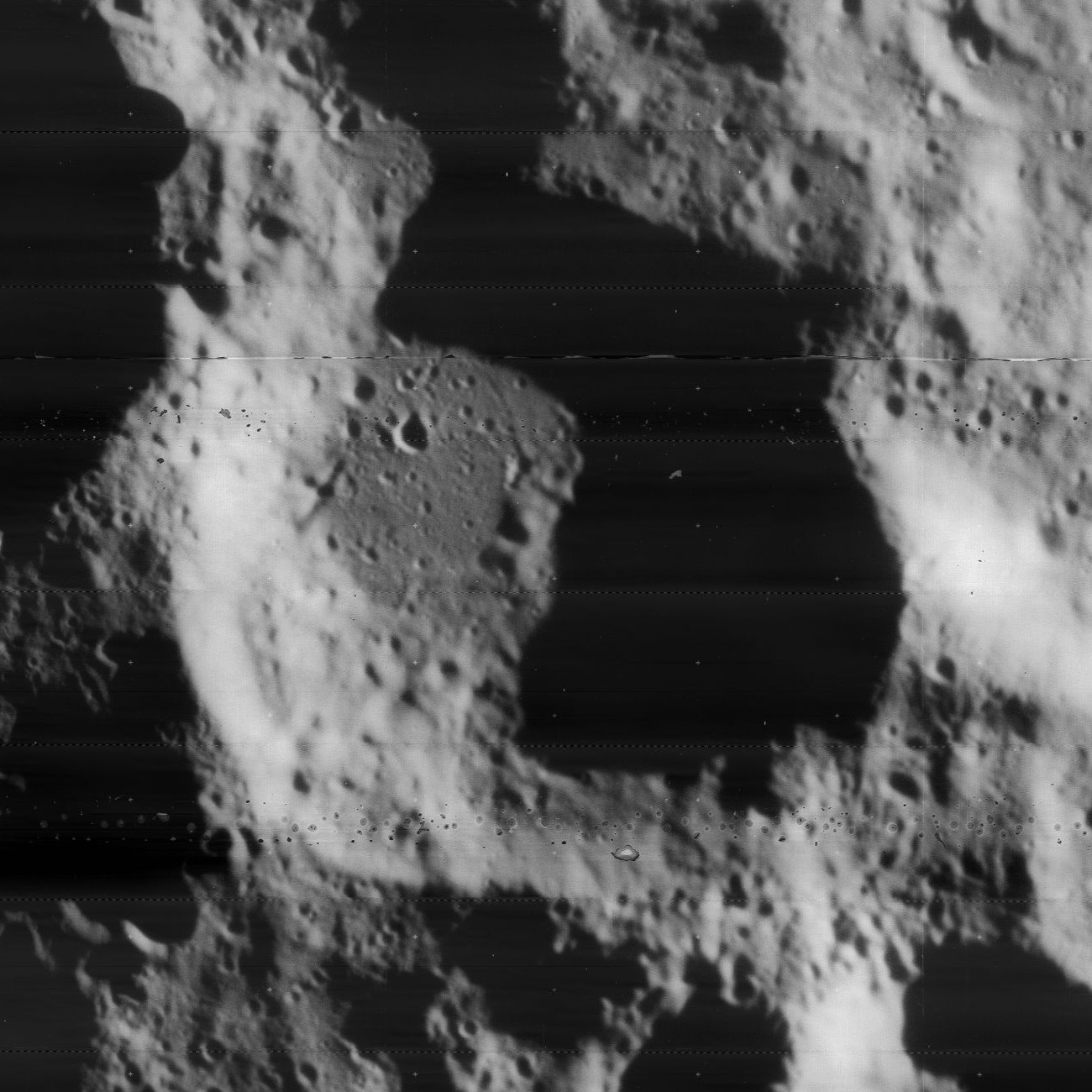
- Lunar Orbiter 4 image with north at top
- Coordinates: 73.0°S 15.2°E
- Diameter: 70 km
- Depth: 4.98 km (3.09 mi)
- Colongitude: 349° at sunrise
- Formation: Pre-Nectarian
- Eponym: Hugh Sempill

Simpelius is an impact crater that lies in the southern part of the Moon. It lies to the north-northwest of the somewhat larger crater Schomberger, and east-southeast of the prominent Moretus.

On the lunar geologic timescale, this formation dates to the Pre-Nectarian period. The most distinctive aspect of this crater is the asymmetry of the inner wall, with the side being nearly twice as wide at the southern end as it is to the north. As a result, the level interior floor is offset to the north of the crater interior. The rim and inner wall are less sharply defined than those of Schomberger or Moretus, having been softened and smoothed by impacts. The rim is uneven, with peaks to the north, west, east, and south-southeast, and low sections in between. There are also a number of small crater pits along the inner wall and the interior floor.

India's Chandrayaan-3 mission successfully landed near the crater at 69.37 degrees south latitude and 32.35 degrees east longitude.

== Satellite craters ==
By convention these features are identified on lunar maps by placing the letter on the side of the crater midpoint that is closest to Simpelius.

Simpelius	Latitude	Longitude	Diameter
A	70.1° S	16.5° E	60 km
B	75.2° S	10.2° E	50 km
C	72.6° S	5.9° E	49 km
D	71.6° S	8.6° E	54 km
E	70.1° S	11.0° E	45 km
F	68.7° S	16.8° E	29 km
G	71.8° S	23.0° E	24 km
H	68.0° S	15.5° E	29 km
J	76.1° S	8.4° E	17 km
K	74.8° S	15.7° E	23 km
L	70.4° S	6.7° E	16 km
M	70.4° S	16.4° E	7 km
N	71.3° S	24.3° E	8 km
P	75.5° S	5.0° E	8 km
