= Chandrayaan-3 =

Indian lunar mission (2023–present)

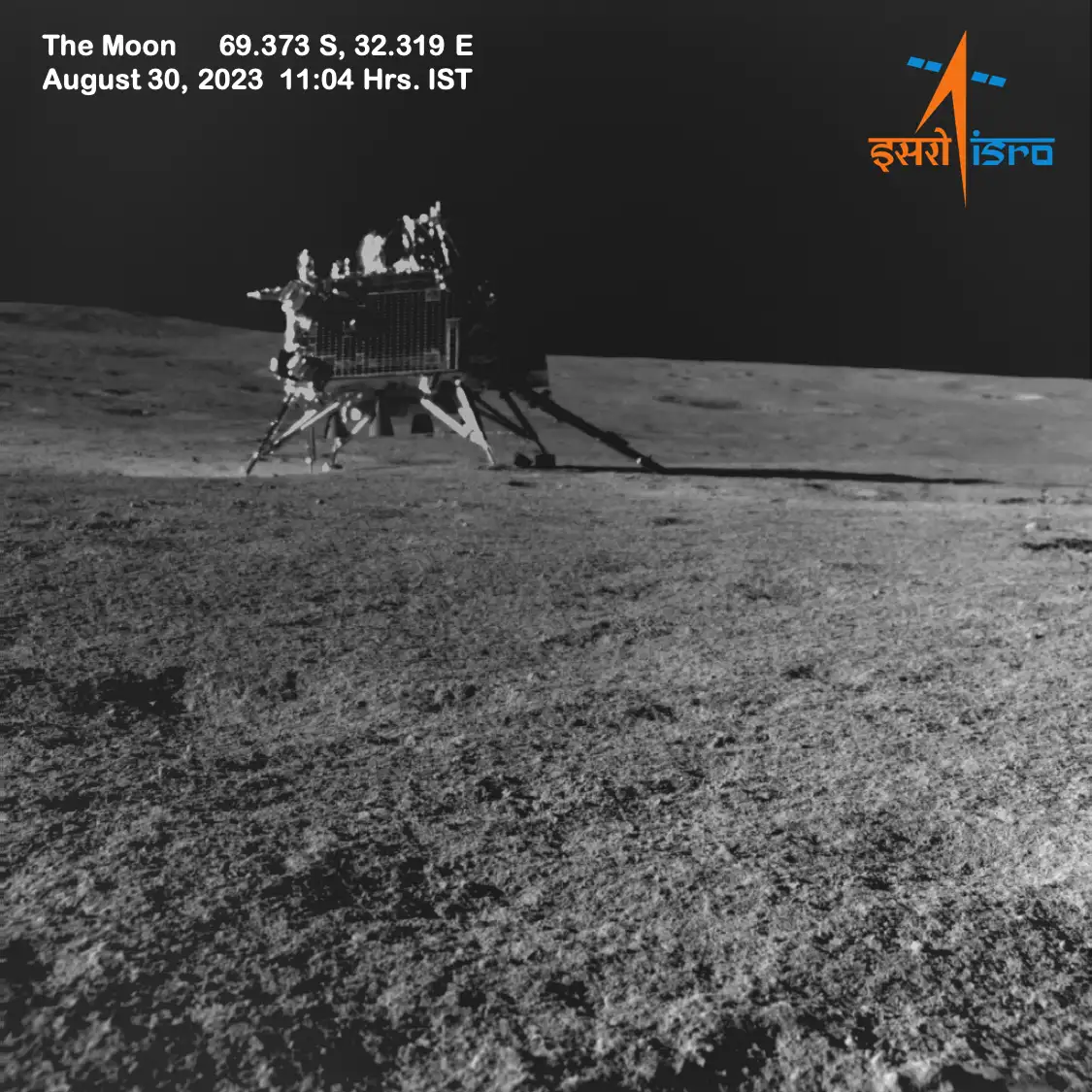
- Image of Vikram lander on lunar surface taken by Pragyan rover navcam at 11:04 IST, 30 August 2023 from 15 meters away
- Mission type: Lander; Rover
- Operator: ISRO
- COSPAR ID: 2023-098A
- SATCAT no.: 57320
- Website: Official website
- Mission duration: 3 years, 3 months and 27 days (PM): Propulsion module: ≤ 3 to 6 months (planned) 3 years, 3 months and 27 days (in service); Vikram lander: ≤ 14 days (planned) 3 years, 2 months, 18 days (since landing); Pragyan rover: ≤ 14 days (planned) 12 days (final) (since deployment)

Spacecraft properties
- Bus: I-3K (modified) Propulsion Module; Vikram (lander)
- Manufacturer: ISRO
- Launch mass: 3900 kg (8600 lb)
- Payload mass: Propulsion Module: 2148 kg (4736 lb); Lander Module (Vikram): 1726 kg (3806 lb); Rover (Pragyan) 26 kg (57 lb); Total: 3900 kg (8600 lb)
- Power: Propulsion Module: 758 W Lander Module: 738 W (WS with Bias); Rover: 50 W

Start of mission
- Launch date: 14 July 2023, 14:35:17 IST (09:05:17 UTC)
- Rocket: LVM3 M4
- Launch site: Satish Dhawan Space Centre
- Contractor: ISRO

Moon orbiter
- Orbital insertion: 5 August 2023

Orbital parameters
- Periselene altitude: 153 km (95 mi)
- Aposelene altitude: 163 km (101 mi)

Moon lander
- Spacecraft component: Vikram lander
- Landing date: 23 August 2023, 18:00 IST (12:33 UTC)
- Return launch: 3 September 2023
- Landing site: Statio Shiv Shakti (Shiv Shakti Point) 69.373°S 32.319°E (between Manzinus C and Simpelius N craters)

Moon rover
- Landing date: 23 August 2023
- Distance driven: 101.4 m (333 ft)

Moon lander
- Spacecraft component: Vikram lander
- Landing date: 23 August 2023
- Landing site: 40 cm (16 in) away from Statio Shiv Shakti (Shiv Shakti Point) (between Manzinus C and Simpelius N craters)

Flyby of Moon
- Spacecraft component: Propulsion module
- Closest approach: 7 November 2023

Flyby of Moon
- Spacecraft component: Propulsion module
- Closest approach: 6 November 2025

Flyby of Moon
- Spacecraft component: Propulsion module
- Closest approach: 11 November 2025 23:18 UTC
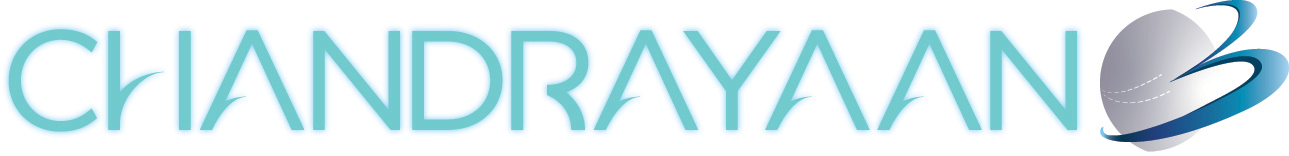
- Mission insignia Chandrayaan programme

Chandrayaan-3 (CHUN-drə-YAHN /ˌtʃʌndrəˈjɑːn/;; from Sanskrit: Chandra, "Moon" and yāna, "craft, vehicle") is the third mission in the Chandrayaan programme, a series of lunar-exploration missions developed by ISRO. The mission consists of Vikram, a lunar lander, and Pragyan, a lunar rover, as replacements for the equivalents on Chandrayaan-2, which had crashed on landing in 2019.

Chandrayaan-3 was launched on 14 July 2023, at 14:35 IST from Satish Dhawan Space Centre (SDSC) in Sriharikota, Andhra Pradesh. It entered lunar orbit on 5 August, and touched down near the lunar south pole, at 69°S, on 23 August 2023 at 18:04 IST (12:34 UTC). With this landing, ISRO became the fourth national space agency to successfully land on the Moon, after the Soviet space program, NASA and CNSA, and the first in human history to achieve a soft landing near the lunar south pole.

The lander was not built to withstand the cold temperatures of the lunar night, so it was shut down at sunset over the landing site, twelve days after landing. The orbiting propulsion module remained operational and was repurposed for scientific observations of Earth; it was shifted from lunar orbit to a high Earth orbit on 22 November 2023, where it remains in service.

== History ==
On 22 July 2019, ISRO launched Chandrayaan-2 on board a LVM3 launch vehicle consisting of an orbiter, a lander and a rover. The lander was scheduled to touch down on the lunar surface on 6 September 2019 to deploy the Pragyan rover. The lander lost contact with mission control, deviated from its intended trajectory while attempting to land near the lunar south pole, and crashed.

The lunar south pole region holds particular interest for scientific exploration. Studies show large amounts of ice there. The ice could contain solid-state compounds that would normally melt under warmer conditions elsewhere on the Moon—compounds which could provide insight into lunar, Earth, and Solar System history. Mountains and craters create unpredictable lighting that protect the ice from melting, but they also make landing there a challenging undertaking for scientific probes. For future crewed missions and outposts, the ice could also be a source of oxygen, of drinking water as well as of fuel due to its hydrogen content.

The European Space Tracking network (ESTRACK), operated by the European Space Agency (ESA), and Deep Space Network operated by Jet Propulsion Laboratory of NASA are supporting the mission. Under a new cross-support arrangement, ESA tracking support could be provided for upcoming ISRO missions such as those of India's first human spaceflight programme, Gaganyaan, and the Aditya-L1 solar research mission. In return, future ESA missions will receive similar support from ISRO's own tracking stations.

For the first time on the lunar surface, a laser beam from NASA's Lunar Reconnaissance Orbiter was broadcast on 12 December 2023, and it was reflected back by a tiny NASA retroreflector on board the Vikram lander. The purpose of the experiment was to determine the retroreflector's surface location from the moon's orbit. The Chandrayaan-3 lander's Laser Retroreflector Array (LRA) instrument began acting as a location marker close to the lunar south pole. Through multinational cooperation, the LRA was housed on the Vikram lander. On a hemispherical support framework, it consists of eight corner-cube retroreflectors. This array enables any orbiting spacecraft equipped with appropriate instruments to use lasers ranging from different directions. The 20 gram passive optical instrument is intended to survive for several decades on the lunar surface.

== Objectives ==
ISRO's mission objectives for the Chandrayaan-3 mission are:

1. Engineering and implementing a lander to land safely and softly on the surface of the Moon.
2. Observing and demonstrating the rover's driving capabilities on the Moon.
3. Conducting and observing experiments on the materials available on the lunar surface to better understand the composition of the Moon.

== Spacecraft ==
=== Design ===
Chandrayaan-3 comprises three main components: a propulsion module, lander module, and rover.

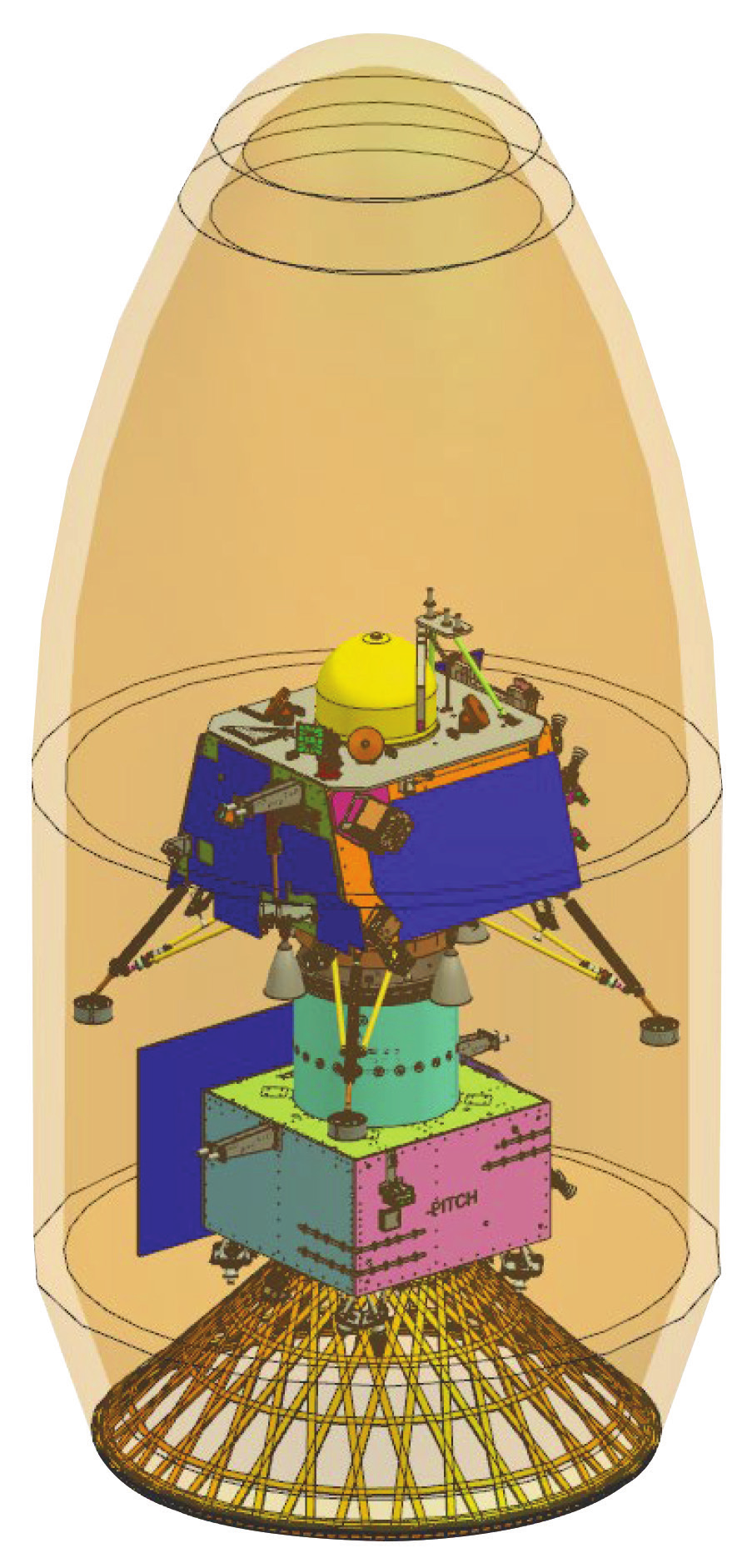
Chandrayaan-3 encapsulated within LVM3's payload fairing

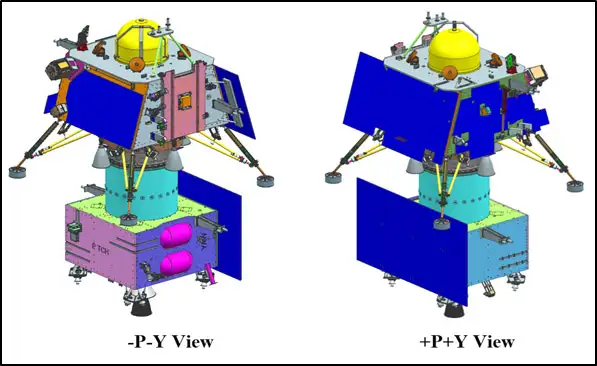
Chandrayaan-3 integrated components

==== Propulsion module ====
The propulsion module carried the lander and rover configuration to a 100-kilometre (62 mi) lunar orbit. It was a box-like structure with a large solar panel mounted on one side and a cylindrical mounting structure for the lander (the Intermodular Adapter Cone) on top.

A few months after the conclusion of the lander portion of the mission, ISRO officials said that the propulsion module was equipped with two radioisotope heating units (RHU), designed and developed by Bhabha Atomic Research Centre (BARC). RHUs keep spacecraft at their operational temperature using the decay of radioactive material, to generate electricity to power heaters. Chandrayaan-3 project director P Veeramuthuvel said ISRO may use nuclear resources to maintain instruments in future rovers. ISRO officials later said the RHUs could not be installed on Chandrayaan-3's Vikram lander and Pragyan rover because it would have increased their mass. This reduced their maximum lifespan to 14 Earth days, or 1 lunar day. This will serve as a precursor test as ISRO is collaborating with the Indian governmental Department of Atomic Energy (DAE) for development of RHU & RTG payloads for the future Chandrayaan and Deep space exploration missions.

On 4 December 2023, ISRO reported that the propulsion module was reinserted into an orbit around the Earth. The primary objective of the reinsertion was to allow Earth observations by spectral and polarimetric instruments. It remains in operation in a High Earth Orbit.

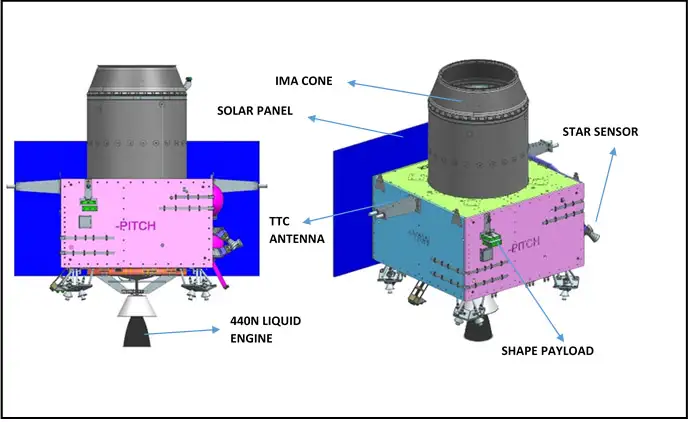
Propulsion module

==== Vikram lander ====
The Vikram lander was responsible for the soft landing on the Moon. It is also box-shaped, with four landing legs and four landing thrusters capable of producing 800 newtons of thrust each. It carried the rover and had various scientific instruments to perform on-site analysis. The lander has four variable-thrust engines with slew rate changing capabilities, unlike Chandrayaan-2's lander, which had five, with the fifth one being centrally mounted and capable only of fixed thrust. One of the main reasons for Chandrayaan-2's landing failure was attitude increase during the camera coasting phase. This was removed by allowing the lander to control attitude and thrust during all phases of descent. Attitude correction rate was increased from Chandrayaan-2's 10°/s to 25°/s with Chandrayaan-3. Additionally, the Chandrayaan-3 lander is equipped with a laser Doppler velocimetry (LDV) to allow measuring attitude in three directions. The impact legs were made stronger compared to Chandrayaan-2 and instrumentation redundancy was improved. It targeted a more precise 16 km^{2} (6.2 sq mi) landing region based on images provided by the Orbiter High-Resolution Camera (OHRC) onboard Chandrayaan-2's orbiter. ISRO improved the structural rigidity, increased polling in instruments, increased data frequency and transmission, and added additional multiple contingency systems to improve lander survivability in the event of failure during descent and landing.

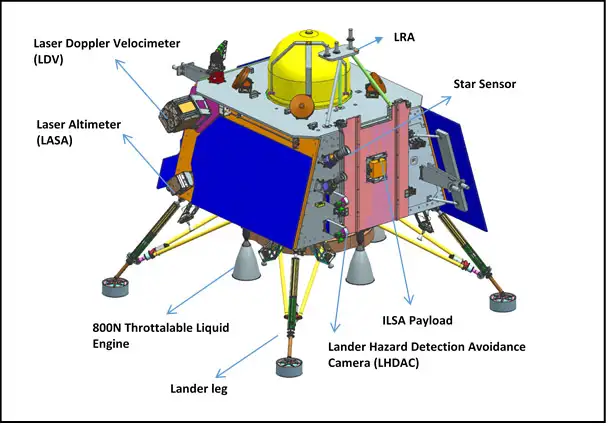
Lander

==== Rover pragyan ====
The Pragyan rover is a six-wheeled vehicle with a mass of 26 kilograms (57 pounds). It is 917 by 750 by 397 millimetres (36.1 in × 29.5 in × 15.6 in) in size. The rover is expected to take multiple measurements to support research into the composition of the lunar surface, the presence of water ice in the lunar soil, the history of lunar impacts, and the evolution of the Moon's atmosphere.

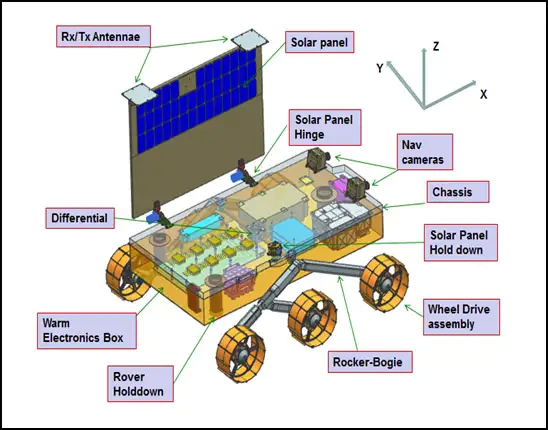
Pragyan rover

=== Payloads ===
==== On lander ====
- Chandra's Surface Thermophysical Experiment (ChaSTE) will measure the thermal conductivity and temperature of the lunar surface.
- Instrument for Lunar Seismic Activity (ILSA) will measure the seismicity around the landing site.
- Radio Anatomy of Moon Bound Hypersensitive Ionosphere and Atmosphere—Langmuir Probe (RAMBHA-LP) will estimate the near-surface plasma density over time.
- Laser Retroreflector Array (LRA) supplied by NASA's Goddard Space Flight Center serving as a fiducial marker on the moon.
Chandra's Surface Thermophysical Experiment (ChaSTE)

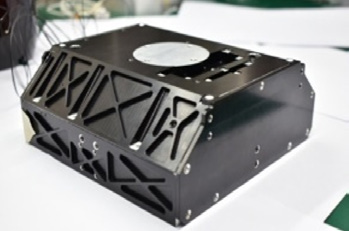
Instrument for Lunar Seismic Activity (ILSA)

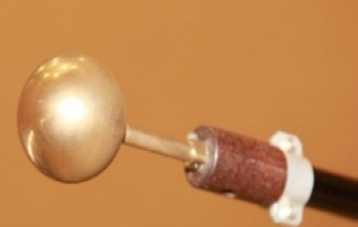
Radio Anatomy of Moon Bound Hypersensitive Ionosphere and Atmosphere—Langmuir Probe (RAMBHA-LP)

==== On rover ====
- An alpha particle X-ray spectrometer (APXS) will derive the chemical composition and infer the mineralogical composition of the lunar surface.
- Laser-induced breakdown spectroscopy (LIBS) will determine the elemental composition (Mg, Al, Si, K, Ca, Ti, Fe) of lunar soil and rocks around the lunar landing site.
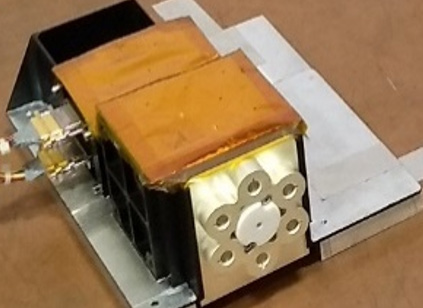
Alpha Particle X-Ray Spectrometer (APXS)

Laser-Induced Breakdown Spectroscope (LIBS)

==== On the propulsion module ====
- Spectro-polarimetry of Habitable Planet Earth (SHAPE) will study spectral and polarimetric measurements of Earth from the lunar orbit in the near-infrared radiation (NIR) wavelength range (1–1.7 μm). Findings of SHAPE might aid in future exoplanet research and search for extraterrestrial life.
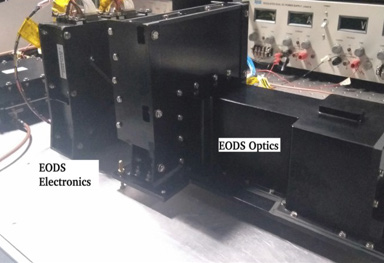
Spectro-polarimetry of Habitable Planet Earth (SHAPE)

== Mission profile ==
Animation of Chandrayaan-3

Around the Earth – orbit raising phase

Around the Earth

Around the Moon

Chandrayaan-3's path · Earth · Moon

=== Launch ===
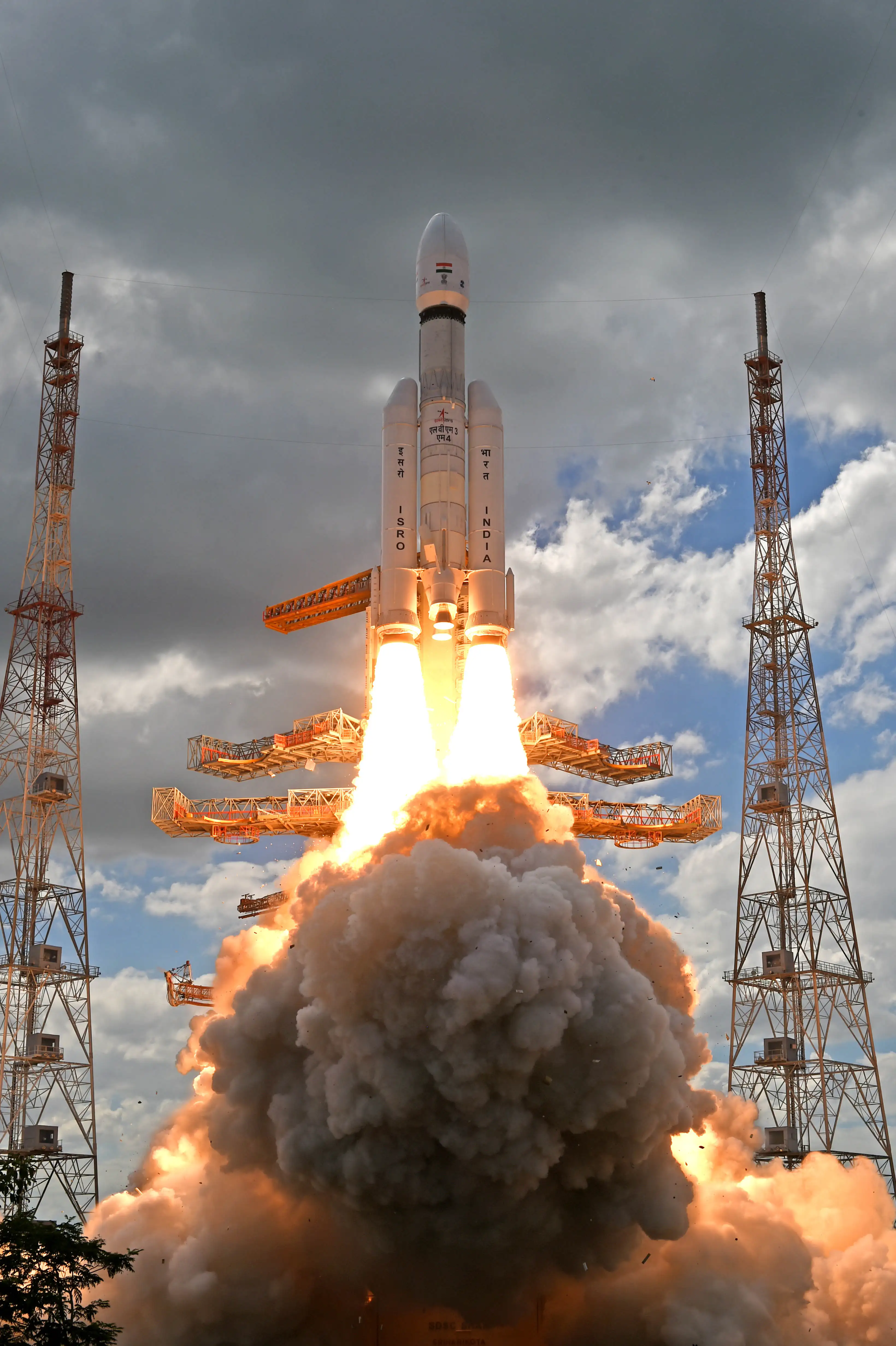
LVM3 M4, Chandrayaan-3 – Launch vehicle lifting off from the second launch pad of SDSC-SHAR, Sriharikota

Chandrayaan-3 was launched aboard an LVM3 M4 rocket on 14 July 2023, at 09:05 UTC from Satish Dhawan Space Centre Second Launch Pad in Sriharikota, Andhra Pradesh, entering an Earth parking orbit with a perigee of 170 km (106 mi) and an apogee of 36,500 km (22,680 mi). On 15 November 2023, the Cryogenic Upper Stage (C25) of the rocket (NORAD ID: 57321) made an uncontrolled re-entry into the Earth's atmosphere around 9:12 UTC. The impact point is predicted over the North Pacific Ocean and the final ground track did not pass over India.

=== Orbit ===
After a series of Earth bound manoeuvres that placed Chandrayaan-3 in a trans-lunar injection orbit, ISRO performed a lunar-orbit insertion (LOI) on 5 August, successfully placing the Chandrayaan-3 spacecraft into an orbit around the Moon. The LOI operation was carried out from the ISRO Telemetry, Tracking, and Command Network (ISTRAC) in Bengaluru.

On 17 August, the Vikram lander separated from the propulsion module to begin landing operations.

=== Landing ===
Landing profile

Vikram lander shows it doing a short hop on the lunar surface.

Rapid deployment of the ramp and rover solar panel

Pragyan rover rampdown

The Moon photographed by the Lander Position Detection Camera (LPDC) aboard Chandrayaan-3 lander on 15 August 2023

View from the Lander Imager Camera-1 (LI-1) on 17 August 2023 just after the separation of the Chandrayaan-3 Lander Module from the Propulsion Module

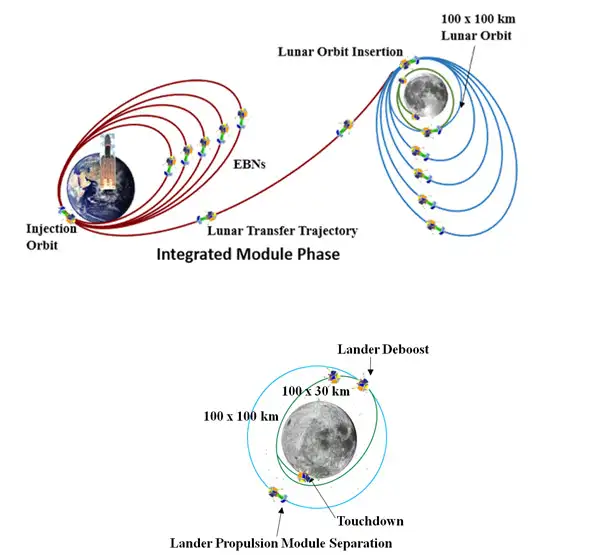
Chandrayaan-3 orbital manoeuvre

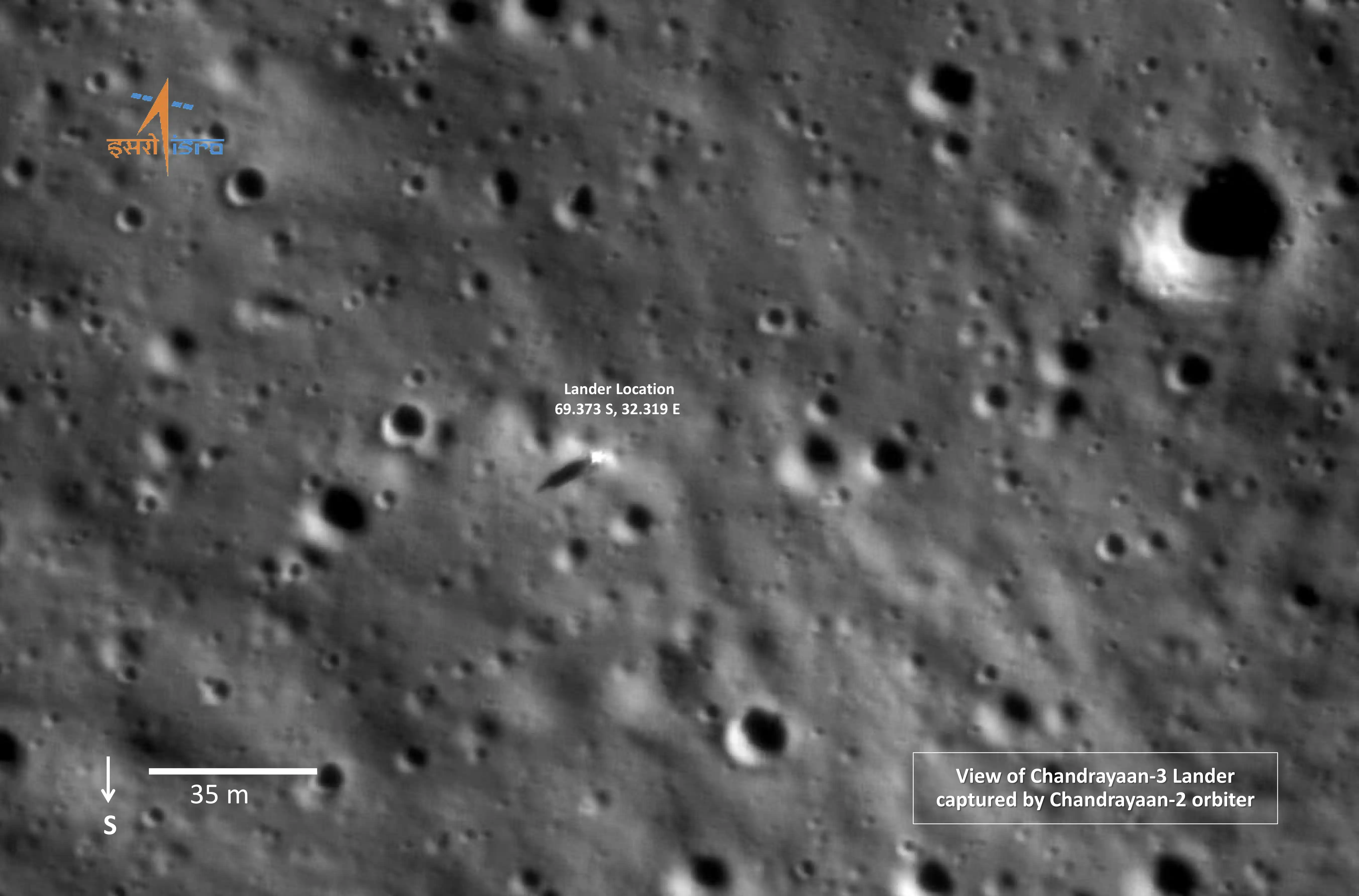
Image of Chandrayaan-3 Lander as captured by OHRC camera aboard Chandrayaan-2 Orbiter

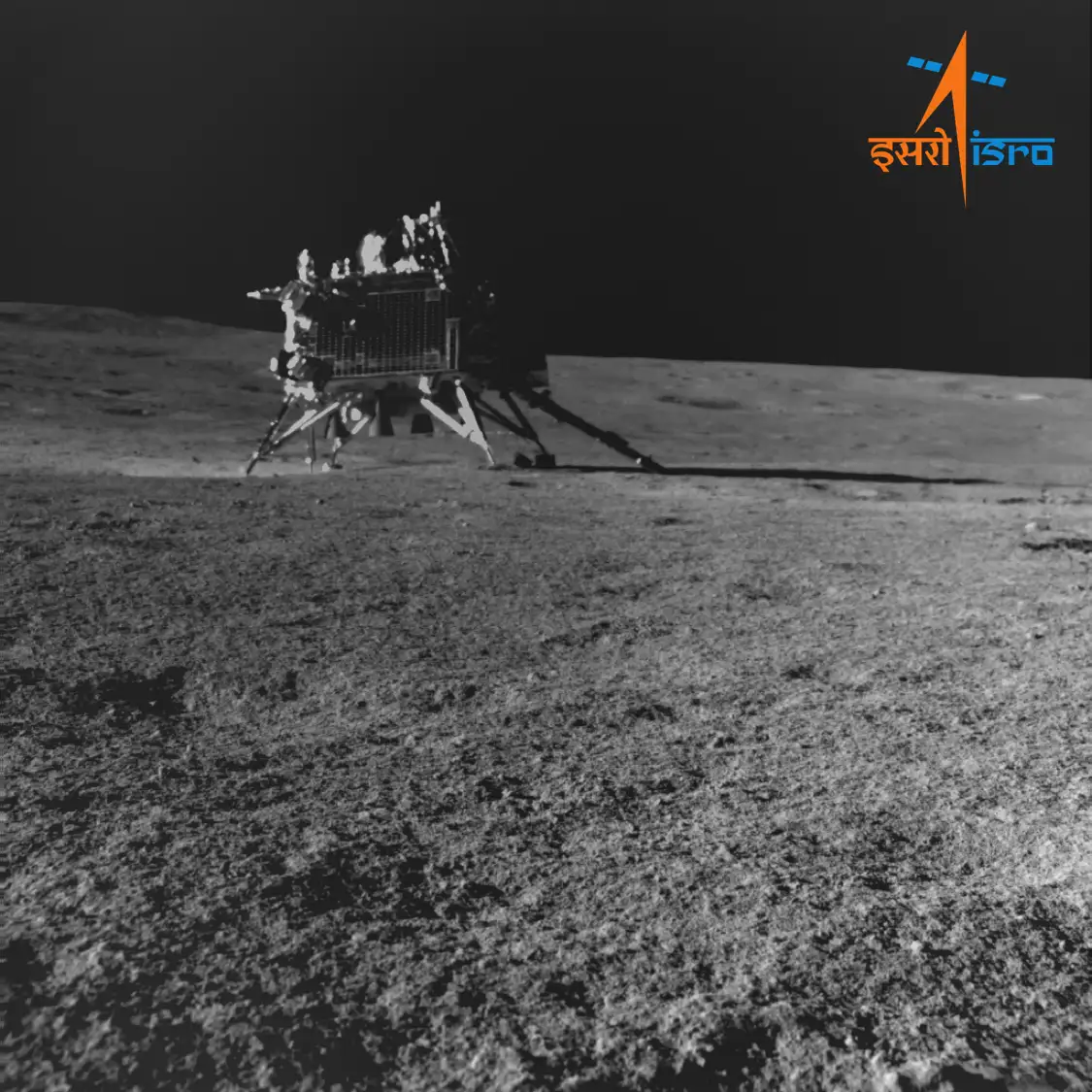
Chandrayaan-3 Lander on the Moon imaged by rover Pragyan 15 meters away

On 23 August 2023, as the lander approached the low point of its orbit, its four engines fired as a braking manoeuvre at 30 kilometres (19 mi) above the Moon's surface. After 11.5 minutes, the lander was 7.2 km (4.5 miles) above the surface; it maintained this altitude for about 10 seconds, then stabilized itself using eight smaller thrusters and rotated from a horizontal to a vertical position while continuing its descent.

It then used two of its four engines to slow its descent to roughly 150 metres (490 ft); it hovered there for about 30 seconds and located an optimal landing spot before continuing downward and touching down at 12:33 UTC.

Stages of Chandrayaan-3 deployment and flight
Stage and sequence	Date/ time (UTC)	LAM burn time	Orbit	Orbital period	References
Earth orbit: Launch	14 July 2023	—N/a	170 km × 36,500 km (110 mi × 22,680 mi)	—N/a	
Earth bound manœuvres: 1	15 July 2023	—N/a	173 km × 41,762 km (107 mi × 25,950 mi)	—N/a	
Earth bound manœuvres: 2	17 July 2023	—N/a	226 km × 41,603 km (140 mi × 25,851 mi)	—N/a	
Earth bound manœuvres: 3	18 July 2023	—N/a	228 km × 51,400 km (142 mi × 31,938 mi)	—N/a	
Earth bound manœuvres: 4	20 July 2023	—N/a	233 km × 71,351 km (145 mi × 44,335 mi)	—N/a	
Earth bound manœuvres: 5	25 July 2023	—N/a	236 km × 127,603 km (147 mi × 79,289 mi)	—N/a	
Trans-lunar injection	31 July 2023	—N/a	288 km × 369,328 km (179 mi × 229,490 mi)	—N/a	
Lunar bound manœuvres:1 (Lunar orbit insertion)	5 August 2023	1,835 s (30.58 min)	164 km × 18,074 km (102 mi × 11,231 mi)	Approx. 21 h (1,300 min)	
Lunar bound manœuvres: 2	6 August 2023	—N/a	170 km × 4,313 km (106 mi × 2,680 mi)	—N/a	
Lunar bound manœuvres:3	9 August 2023	—N/a	174 km × 1,437 km (108 mi × 893 mi)	—N/a	
Lunar bound manœuvres:4	14 August 2023	—N/a	150 km × 177 km (93 mi × 110 mi)	—N/a	
Lunar bound manœuvres:5	16 August 2023	—N/a	153 km × 163 km (95 mi × 101 mi)	—N/a	
Lander deorbit manœuvres: 1	18 August 2023	—N/a	113 km × 157 km (70 mi × 98 mi)	—N/a	
Lander deorbit manœuvres: 2	19 August 2023	60 s (1.0 min)	25 km × 134 km (16 mi × 83 mi)	—N/a	
Landing	23 August 2023		—N/a	—N/a	
Rover deployment	23 August 2023	—N/a	—N/a	—N/a	

=== Surface operations ===
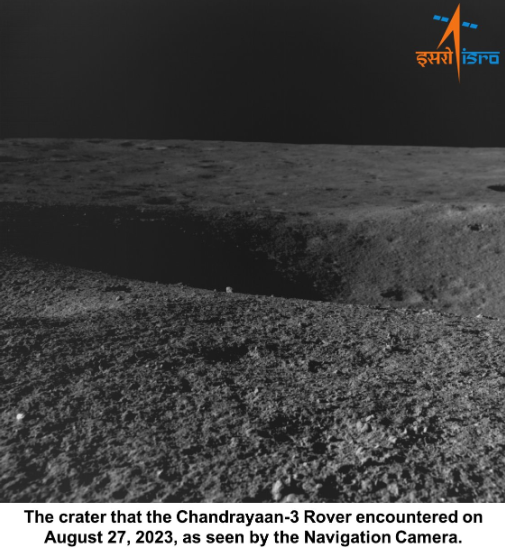
A 4-metre-diameter (13 ft) crater, as photographed by the Navigation camera on board the rover

On 3 September, the rover was put into sleep mode after it had completed all of its assignments. Its batteries were charged and receiver left on, according to ISRO, in preparation for the impending lunar night. "The rover's payloads are turned off and the data it collected has been transmitted to Earth via the lander", the statement said. Chandrayaan-3's lander and rover were expected to operate only for one lunar daylight period, or 14 Earth days, and the on-board electronics were not designed to withstand the −120 °C (−184 °F) nighttime temperatures on the Moon. On 22 September, the lander and rover missed their wake-up calls, and by 28 September neither had responded, diminishing hopes for further surface operations.

Hop experiment

Vikram fired its engines for a brief 'hop' on the lunar surface on 3 September, ascending 40 cm (16 in) off the lunar surface and translating 50 cm laterally across the surface. The lander came to a rest on a nearby slope of roughly 2.6, and turned about −0.97°,1.15°,2° (X,Y,Z-coordinates) with respect to its initial orientation. Vikram became the second lander to successfully perform hop experiment in moon, after NASA's Surveyor 6 in 1976. The test demonstrated capabilities to be used in potential future sample return missions. The instruments and rover deployment ramp were retracted for the hop and redeployed afterwards.

=== Propulsion module reinserted to orbit around Earth ===
The propulsion module of Chandrayaan-3 was moved out of lunar orbit to an orbit around Earth. Although the plan was to operate SHAPE for three months in lunar orbit, it was decided to utilise over 100 kg of fuel left in the PM after one month of operation to derive additional information for future lunar missions, and determine strategies for sample return missions and gravity-assisted flyby missions. ISRO's flight dynamics team had developed software to be validated through these return manoeuvres.

The first lunar bound apogee raising manoeuvre was executed on 9 October 2023 raising the apogee from 150 km to 5112 km and orbital period from 2.1 hours to 7.2 hours. The trans-Earth injection was done on 13 October 2023 with a targeted orbit of ~380,000 x 180,000 km. This was followed by four lunar flyby's with the last one on 7 November 2023. The module exited lunar SOI on 10 November 2023 and had the first perigee crossing on 22 November 2023 at an altitude of about 154,000 km. The propulsion module is currently orbiting Earth with a perigee and apogee altitude that vary during its trajectory and the predicted minimum perigee altitude is 115,000 kilometres (71,000 mi), with an orbital period of nearly 13 days with 27 degree inclination. The SHAPE payload is operated whenever Earth is in its field of view, as well during special events such as the 28 October 2023 solar eclipse. The SHAPE payload operations are planned to continue further.

=== Propulsion module additional lunar flyby phase ===
The PM made another flyby of the moon on November 6, 2025, at a distance of 3,740 km from the lunar surface, though it was outside the IDSN communication range at that time. A second, closely monitored flyby took place on November 11, 2025 at 23:18 UTC, brought the module whitin 4,537 km of the Moon to conduct engineering and scientific research.These events changed the satellite's orbital parameters,shifting its inclination from 34° to 22° with the lunar plane and expanding its elliptical orbit from 100,000 x 300,000 km to 409,000 x 727,000 km. During this phase it was also misattributed as a near earth asteroid, with a provisional designation as CE1M9G2.

Animation of Chandrayaan-3 propulsion module

Around the Earth

Around the Moon

Chandrayaan-3 PM · Earth · Moon

=== Mission life ===
- Propulsion module: Carries lander and rover to 100-by-100-kilometre (62 mi × 62 mi) orbit, with operation of experimental payload for up to six months but still in active service.
- Lander module: one lunar daylight period (14 Earth days).
- Rover module: one lunar daylight period (14 Earth days).

=== Team ===
- ISRO chairman: S. Somanath
- Mission director: S. Mohanakumar
- Associate mission director: G. Narayanan
- Project director: P. Veeramuthuvel
- Associate project director: Kalpana Kalahasti
- Vehicle director: Biju C. Thomas

== Funding ==
In December 2019, ISRO requested the initial funding of the project, amounting to ₹750 crore (US$80 million), out of which ₹600 crore (US$64 million) would be for meeting expenditure towards machinery, equipment, and other capital expenditure, while the remaining ₹150 crore (US$16 million) was sought for operating expenditure. Amit Sharma, CEO of an ISRO vendor, said, "With local sourcing of equipment and design elements, we are able to reduce the price considerably."

Confirming the existence of the project in early 2020, ISRO's former chairman K. Sivan stated that the estimated cost would be around ₹615 crore (equivalent to ₹790 crore or US$84 million in 2026).

== Results ==
The Associated Press, while commenting on the success of the mission, said, "The successful mission showcases India's rising standing as a technology and space powerhouse and dovetails with Prime Minister Narendra Modi's desire to project an image of an ascendant country asserting its place among the global elite." About results on water existence, "There was no word on the outcome of the rover searches for signs of frozen water on the lunar surface (...)".

=== Temperature variation ===
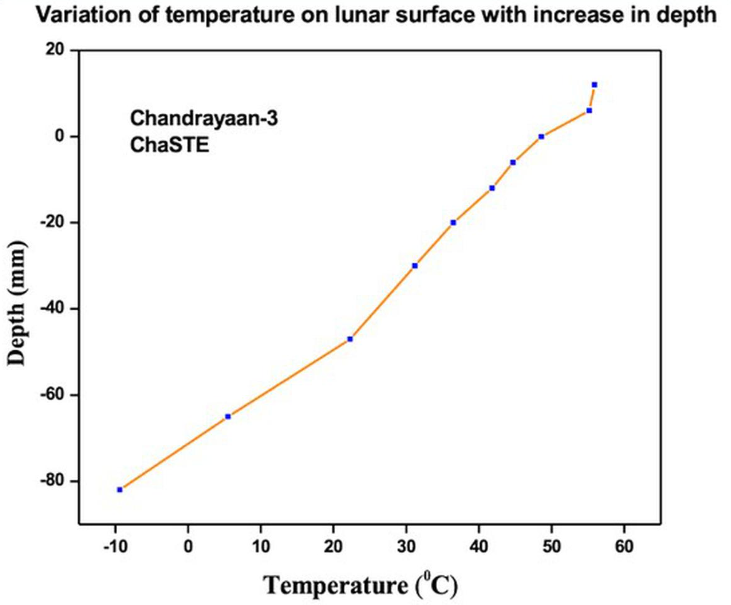
The graph of temperature variation across the lunar topsoil at a point in the solar polar region, as measured by the ChaSTE instrument

ISRO also released data from the observations made by ChaSTE (Chandra's Surface Thermophysical Experiment), one of the four instruments present on the lander module. ChaSTE was designed to study the heat conductivity of the Moon's surface and measure the differences in temperatures at different points on and below the surface, with the overall objective of creating a thermal profile of the Moon.The in-situ measurements of the temperature profile were the first to be made regarding the thermophysical properties within the top 10 centimetres (3.9 in) of the lunar surface at a high latitude south polar landing location.

ISRO scientist BH Darukesha said that the high range of 70 °C (158 °F) temperature near the surface was "not expected".

=== Detection of sulfur ===
On 29 August, ISRO reported that the laser-induced breakdown spectroscope (LIBS) instrument on board the Pragyan rover has "unambiguously" confirmed the presence of sulfur in the lunar surface near the south pole, through "first-ever in-situ measurements". The presence of sulfur on the Moon has been known before; however, it was detected for the first time near the south pole by the rover.

Noah Petro, a project scientist at NASA, while speaking to the BBC, stated that while sulfur has been known to be in the lunar regolith from Apollo program samples, he described Pragyan's findings as a "tremendous accomplishment".

Apart from sulfur, the rover also detected other elements including aluminium (Al), calcium (Ca), iron (Fe), chromium (Cr), titanium (Ti), manganese (Mn), silicon (Si), and oxygen (O). The agency said it is also searching for hydrogen (H).

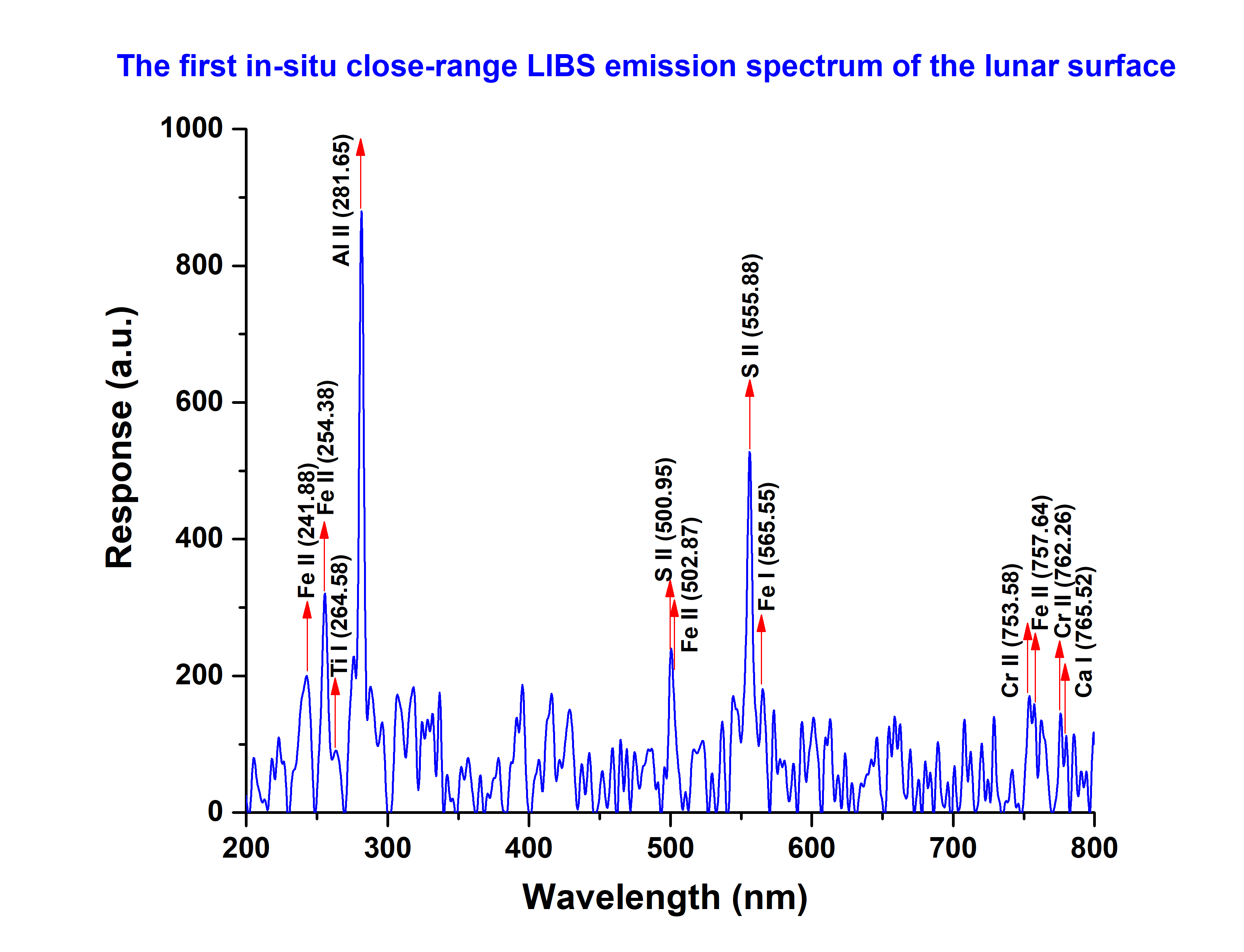
Pragyan rover detected elements present on the Moon.

=== Plasma measurement ===
On 31 August, ISRO released plasma density data from the RAMBHA Instrument aboard the Vikram lander, marking the first in-situ measurements of plasma at the lunar poles. The probe aims to explore the changes in the near-surface plasma environment throughout the duration of the lunar day. Initial assessments reported relatively low plasma densities above the lunar surface varying from 5 to 30 million electrons/m^{3}. This evaluation pertains to early stages of the lunar day. Later data collected over the lunar day measured it to be between 380 and 600 electrons/cm³. This is significantly higher than estimates derived from observations taken from orbit using Radio Occultation techniques by the Chandrayaan 2 orbiter. The electrons also possess remarkably high energy, with kinetic temperatures soaring between 3,000 and 8,000 Kelvin.

=== Seismic measurements ===
On 31st August 2023, ISRO released data from the ILSA payload on the lander, providing vibration measurements of the rover movement on 25 August, and a presumed natural event on 26 August. Although the cause of the latter event is a subject of investigation, it is suspected to be a moonquake.

=== In-situ temperature measurements ===
The ChaSTE probe penetrated into the lunar soil to carry out measurements for the entire duration of the mission. ChaSTE in-situ measurements were carried out for a significant fraction of a lunar day (~8 AM – 4 PM Local time at the Moon) i.e. approximately 10 Earth days (i.e. from 24 Aug. – 2 Sept. 2023) at an interval of about a second.

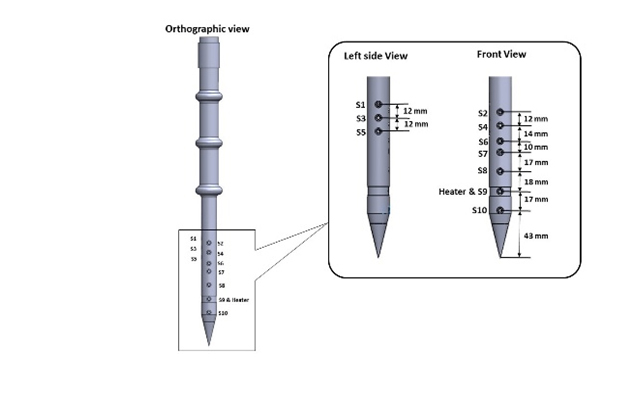
Temperature sensors along the arm of Chandra's Surface Thermophysical Experiment (ChaSTE)

In research published in March 2025, ChaSTE observations during the mission indicated that the lunar surface temperatures show a significant spatial variability at metre scales at high latitudes, unlike at the equatorial regions. These effects become prominent as we move towards poles, an important aspect that should be considered for future exploration. The peak surface temperature at the landing site was measured to be 355 K (± 0.5 K), a temperature relatively higher than ~330 K (±3K), as predicted by earlier observations. This unexpected higher temperature is due to penetration of ChaSTE on the Sun-ward (equator-ward) facing surface with a slope of ~6o. Lunar surface temperature measured from a flat surface using an independent sensor, about a metre away from ChaSTE location, was found to be ~332 K (±1 K), which is consistent with orbiter based remote sensing observation (~330 K).

By understanding how well the surface layer conducts heat and how much heat it can hold, as done by ChaSTE, scientists can figure out how heat moves around, predict temperatures below the surface, and see how sunlight interacts with the Moon. This would also help engineers to find subsurface locations with benign thermal environment and design safe places to plan future trips and live on the Moon.

=== Lunar mantle ===
Concentrations of volatile elements found in the Primitive lunar mantle material measured at Shiv Shakti station near the South Polar Region were determined using PRL's Alpha Particle X-ray Spectrometer (APXS) onboard the Pragyan rover. This new finding makes the Chandrayaan-3 landing site a promising site to access primitive mantle samples, which is otherwise lacking in the existing lunar collections.

=== Lunar subsoil displacement ===
Following the 'hop' experiment, when the Vikram lander briefly reignited its engines, the lunar lander flew above the surface in a gentle arc, peaking at about 40 centimetres (16 in) before touching the ground, displaced from its original landing position by about 50 centimetres (20 in) and slightly rotated its position on the Moon. The exhaust gases from the main engines blew away close to 3 centimetres (1.2 in) of lunar regolith at Statio Shiv Shakthi. Upon concluding the pilot project, mission engineers redeployed the ChaSTE instrument on the waning hours of the lunar day to record temperature changes during the transition from lunar day to night. The instrument data unveiled the presence of a more firm and compact layer of the lunar subsoil. The new ground showcased a two-level structure of the lunar surface within the top 6.5 centimetres (2.6 in) of the Moon's surface at the new location. The upper layers, extending to about 3 centimetres (1.2 in) below the surface were found to conduct heat more efficiently, whereas the lower layers showed reduced thermal conductivity, indicating slight differences in composition or packing.

ChaSTE also found that re-ignition of the Lander engine resulted in moderate erosion of the upper layers of the lunar regolith, and that it was formed in a Cake-like Stratigraphy. The upper layers of the regolith were found to be highly cohesive and porous, which could act as a thermal blanket at a depth of 6.5 centimetres (2.6 in) from the surface with the lunar soil becoming twice as dense and five times more cohesive, with observed changes from 300 to 1,600 pascals (0.044 to 0.232 psi). Further analysis could identify the process that resulted in storage of water-ice molecules in the lunar subsurface, and could aid in selecting landing sites for future scientific bases on the moon. ChaSTE also captured a dip in surface temperatures during the lunar twilight, which at Shiv Shakti point lasted over 57 minutes. A temperature difference of −60 °C (−76 °F) was observed as compared to surface temperatures were observed during this phase.

=== Lunar meteorites ===
An analysis conducted by co-relating data from the Pragyan rover's APXS instrument aided scientists from PRL to conduct a comprehensive geochemical study of the lunar surface in 2026. It was discovered from these findings that the composition of the ALHA 81005 meteorite discovered in the Allan Hills region of Antarctica and the first meteor suspected to be of lunar origin to have closly matched those values explored by the rover at the Shiv Shakthi plains. Although it could not be concluded that the rock is indeed from the Lunar South pole, The study postulated multiple more theories on the impact created by the formation of the South-pole Atiken basiN, that has altered the geochemical composition of the Shiv Shakthi landing site.

== Reactions ==
=== Domestic reactions ===
Chandrayaan-3's landing live stream on ISRO's official YouTube channel received eight million concurrent viewers, which is the highest in YouTube's history for a live video.

Congratulating the ISRO team behind the successful Chandrayaan-3 mission at ISRO Telemetry, Tracking and Command Network in Bengaluru, Indian Prime Minister Narendra Modi announced that the touchdown point of the Vikram lander would henceforth be known as Station Shiv Shakti. He further declared 23 August, the day the Vikram lander landed on the Moon, as National Space Day.

ISRO chief S. Somanath proclaimed "India is on the Moon" after the successful touchdown. "We learnt a lot from our failure and corrected it. It's now 14 days of work and we have to conduct experiments," he told India Today.

P Veeramuthuvel, the project director of the mission said, "It's a great moment of happiness. On behalf of the team it gives me immense satisfaction on achieving this goal as the Project Director of the mission. The entire mission operations right from launch till landing happened flawlessly as per the timeline". S. Mohana Kumar, the mission director, said that Chandrayaan-3 was a "team effort".

Meanwhile, former ISRO chief K Sivan, under whose tenure the Chandrayaan-2 was launched said, "We are really excited to see this grand success. For this, we have been waiting for the last four years. This success is sweet news for us and for the entire nation."

DY Chandrachud, the chief justice of India hailed the landing as "a milestone in the onward march of our nation" and congratulated the ISRO team.

=== International reactions ===
Josef Aschbacher, director general of the European Space Agency, said: "Incredible! Congratulations to ISRO, Chandrayaan-3, and to all the people of India!! What a way to demonstrate new technologies AND achieve India's first soft landing on another celestial body. Well done, I am thoroughly impressed."

Abdulla Shahid, the foreign minister of Maldives, wrote "As a South Asian nation, and neighbour, we are proud of the successful landing of Chandrayaan 3 near the moon's south pole. This is a success for all of humanity! Opening new avenues for new areas of exploration."

Bill Nelson, the administrator of NASA wrote "Congratulations ISRO on your successful Chandrayaan-3 lunar South Pole landing and congratulations to India on being the 4th country to successfully soft-land a spacecraft on the Moon. We're glad to be your partner on this mission".

Cyril Ramaphosa, the president of South Africa said "This for us, as the BRICS family, is a momentous occasion and we rejoice with you. We join you in the joy of this great achievement."

The Kremlin quoted Russian president Vladimir Putin's message to Indian president Droupadi Murmu and Modi, "Please, accept my heartfelt congratulations on the occasion of the successful landing of the Indian space station Chandrayaan-3 on the Moon near its South Pole. This is a big step forward in space exploration and certainly a testament to the impressive progress made by India in the area of science and technology".

Nepal's prime minister Pushpa Kamal Dahal said "I congratulate Prime Minister Shri Narendra Modi ji and ISRO team of India on successful landing of Chandrayan-3 in the surface of the moon today and unleashing of a historic achievement in science and space technology."

== Awards ==
The Exploration Museum has bestowed upon ISRO the esteemed Leif Erikson Lunar Prize in honor of the space agency's resolute dedication and noteworthy advancements in lunar exploration in 2023.

In recognition of its accomplishments with the historic Chandrayaan-3 mission in 2023, ISRO has been bestowed with the esteemed Aviation Week Laureates Award. Sripriya Ranganathan, Deputy Ambassador at the Indian Embassy in the US, accepted the award on behalf of ISRO.

The Chandrayaan-3 mission team has raised the bar for space exploration, and for that reason, they have been awarded the prestigious 2024 John L. 'Jack' Swigert Jr. Award for Space Exploration. On 8 April 2024, at the opening ceremony of the annual Space Symposium in Colorado, India's Consul General D.C. Manjunath accepted the prize on behalf of the Indian Space Research Organization.

The International Astronautical Federation has presented Chandrayaan-3 with the World Space Award. The award presentation is slated to take place on October 14 in Milan, during the 75th International Astronautical Congress opening ceremony. According to the International Astronautical Federation, Chandrayaan-3 mission by ISRO exemplifies the synergy of scientific curiosity and cost-effective engineering.

The Google Doodle for August 24, 2023 featured the Chandrayaan-3 lander.

The American Institute of Aeronautics and Astronautics presented Chandrayaan-3 with the 2026 Goddard Astronautics Award on 21 May 2026, during the AIAA ASCEND 2026 conference in Washington, D.C. The award honors Chandrayaan-3's accomplishment of becoming the first spacecraft to successfully land close to the south pole of the Moon. The mission confirmed the presence of essential chemical elements in the lunar south pole, indicating that local resources might eventually support manufacturing operations on the lunar surface.

== See also ==
- List of missions to the Moon
- Lunar Polar Exploration Mission – Lunar exploration mission by India and Japan
- Aditya-L1 – Indian solar observation mission
- Gaganyaan – Indian crewed spacecraft project
- Indian Human Spaceflight Programme
- Indian Martian Exploration Programme
- Venus Orbiter Mission – Indian Venus exploration mission
