= P Veeramuthuvel =

Indian space scientist (born 1976)

- ப. வீர முத்துவேல்
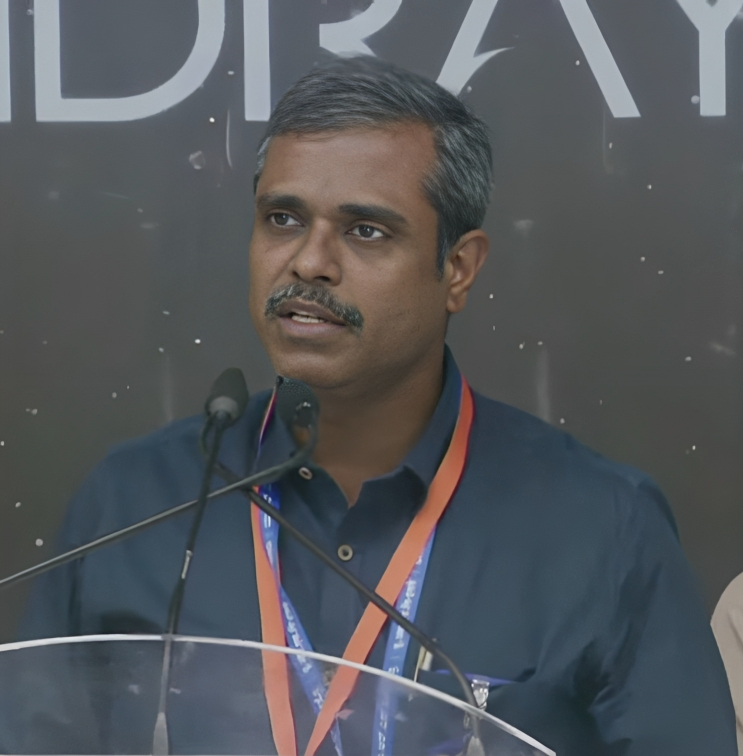
- Veeramuthuvel in 2023
- Born: 22 October 1976 (age 49); Viluppuram, Tamil Nadu, India
- Education: Sri Sai Ram Engineering College (Engineering); NIT Trichy (MTech); IIT Madras (PhD)
- Occupation: Aerospace engineer
- Years active: 2014–present
- Employer: Hindustan Aeronautics Limited; Indian Space Research Organisation

Palanivel Veeramuthuvel (born 22 October 1976) is an Indian aerospace engineer and scientist who works for the Indian Space Research Organisation. He served as the project director of the Chandrayaan-3 mission.

== Early life and education ==
P Veeramuthuvel was born on 22 October 1976 in Viluppuram, Tamil Nadu, India. He attended the railway school in Villupuram and earned a diploma in mechanical engineering from Ezhumalai Polytechnic College, Villupuram. He attended Sri Sai Ram Engineering College in Chennai for his BTech degree in Mechanical Engineering and then NIT Trichy for his MTech degree. He further on completed his PhD at IIT Madras from 2011 to 2015.

== Career ==
Veeramuthuvel joined Lakshmi Engineering Works, Coimbatore as a senior engineer. He then joined the rotary wing research and design center of the helicopter division of Hindustan Aeronautics Limited Bangalore. He joined ISRO in 2004, where he worked on multiple projects and held various responsibilities, including planning for the second Mars Orbiter Mission. In parallel, he completed post-graduate studies at the IIT Madras.

Veeramuthuvel has served as the deputy director of the ISRO's main office's Space Infrastructure Programme. In 2019, he was appointed as the director of the Chandrayaan 3 mission. He succeeded Muthayya Vanitha, who oversaw the Chandrayaan-2 mission as its project director. He was also instrumental in the Chandrayaan-2 mission, coordinating with NASA on the project's prospects and science.
