= Trans-Earth injection =

Space flight maneuver

A trans-Earth injection (TEI) is a propulsion maneuver used to set a spacecraft on a trajectory which will intersect the Earth's sphere of influence, usually putting the spacecraft on a free return trajectory.

The maneuver is performed by a rocket engine.

== From the Moon ==
The spacecraft is usually in a parking orbit around the Moon at the time of TEI, in which case the burn is timed so that its midpoint is opposite the Earth's location upon arrival. Uncrewed space probes have also performed this maneuver from the Moon starting with Luna 16's direct ascent traverse from the lunar surface in 1970.

On the Apollo missions, it was performed by the restartable Service Propulsion System (SPS) engine on the Service Module after the undocking of the (LM) Lunar Module if provided. An Apollo TEI burn lasted approximately 150 seconds, providing a posigrade velocity increase of 1,000 m/s (3,300 ft/s). It was first performed by the Apollo 8 mission on December 25, 1968. It was last performed by the propulsion module of Chandrayaan-3 mission during 13 October 2023

=== List of missions that performed a Trans-Earth injection ===
Total 17 missions have performed such a maneuver. NASA has performed it the most (10 times), followed by Soviet Union (3 times), China (3 times), and India (once). These missions are in order,

- Apollo 8
- Apollo 10
- Apollo 11
- Apollo 12
- Luna 16
- Apollo 14
- Apollo 15
- Luna 20
- Apollo 16
- Apollo 17
- Luna 24
- Clementine
- Chang'e 5-T1
- Chang'e 5
- Artemis 1
- Chandrayaan-3
- Chang'e 6
- Artemis 2

== From outside the Earth-Moon system ==
In 2004, from outside the Earth-Moon system, the Stardust probe comet dust return mission performed TEI after visiting Comet Wild 2.

== See also ==
- Lunar orbit insertion
- Trans-lunar injection
- Trans-Mars injection
