= National Space Day (India) =

National holiday in India

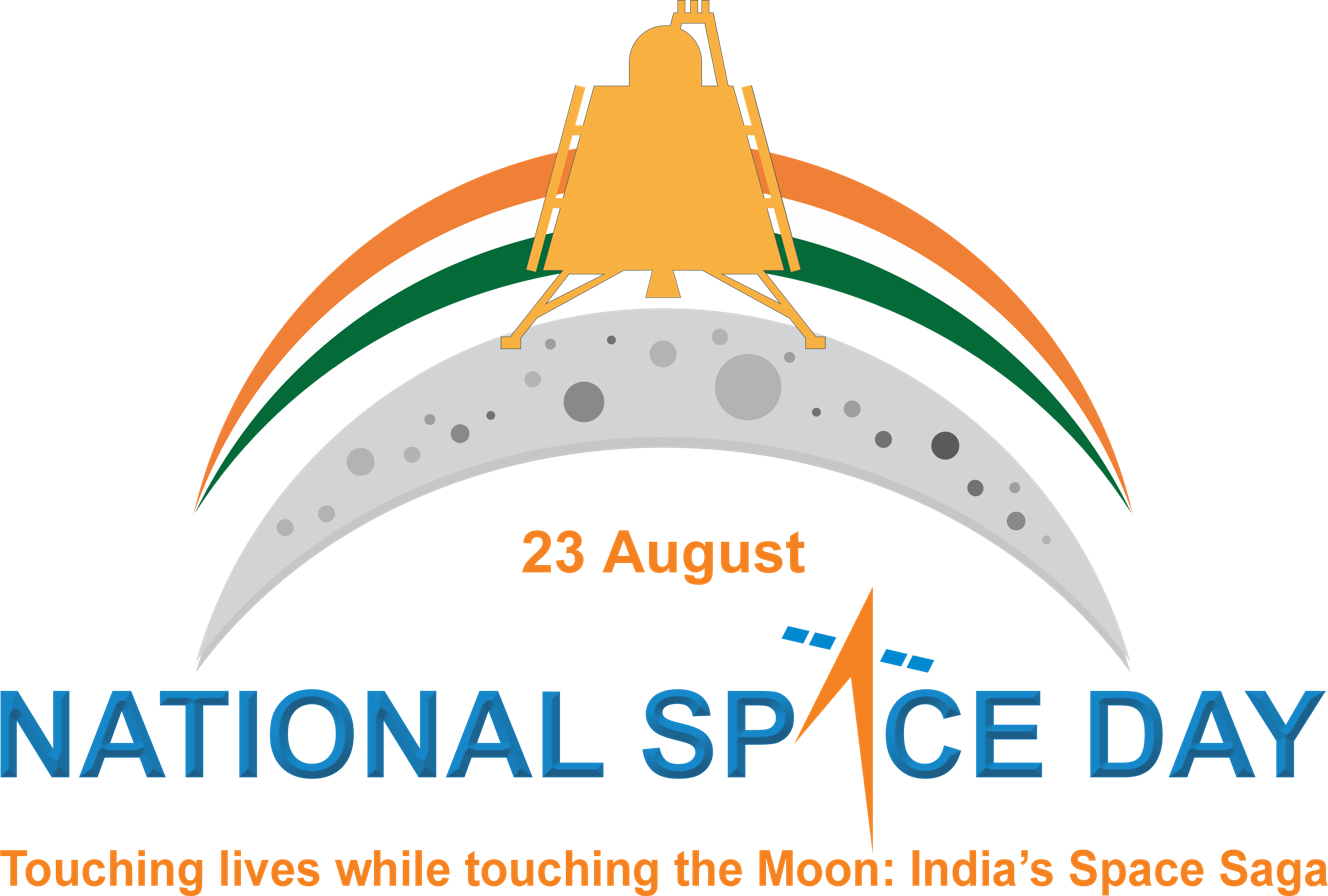
- Logo of National Space Day
- Official name: National Space Day
- Observed by: India
- Type: National
- Significance: Commemorates Chandrayaan-3's successful landing on the Moon
- Date: 23 August
- Frequency: Annually
- First time: 23 August 2024
- Started by: ISRO
- Related to: www.isro.gov.in/NSPD2025/

National Space Day in India commemorates the successful landing of Chandrayaan-3 on the Moon. It is celebrated on 23 August.

== History ==
On 23 August 2023, ISRO reached a significant milestone by successfully landing Chandrayaan-3's lander and rover on the Moon. With this, India became the fourth country to land on the Moon and first to land near the southern polar region of the Moon. The soft-landing was followed by successful deployment of Pragyan Rover. Recognizing this achievement, Prime Minister Narendra Modi proclaimed August 23 as "National Space Day" in India.

== Programms on first National Space Day ==
The first National Space Day was celebrated across India in 2024. The Government of India organized a month-long campaign to showcase the achievements of India's space missions and to inspire the youth. Its theme, "Touching Lives while Touching the Moon: India's Space Saga", highlights the significant impact of space exploration on society and technology.

=== Two-day finale at Bharat Mandapam ===
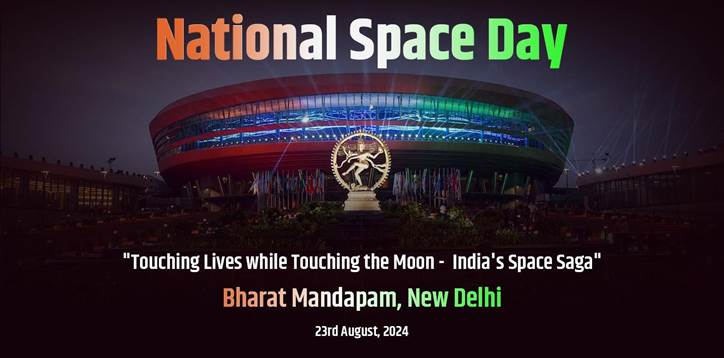
2024 NSpD two-day finale at Bharat Mandapam

A two-day event took place at Bharat Mandapam in honour of National Space Day, showcasing a range of high-profile sessions, interactive exhibitions, and significant announcements related to India's space achievements.

=== Space on Wheels – Showcasing ISRO's Vision for Scientific Advancement ===
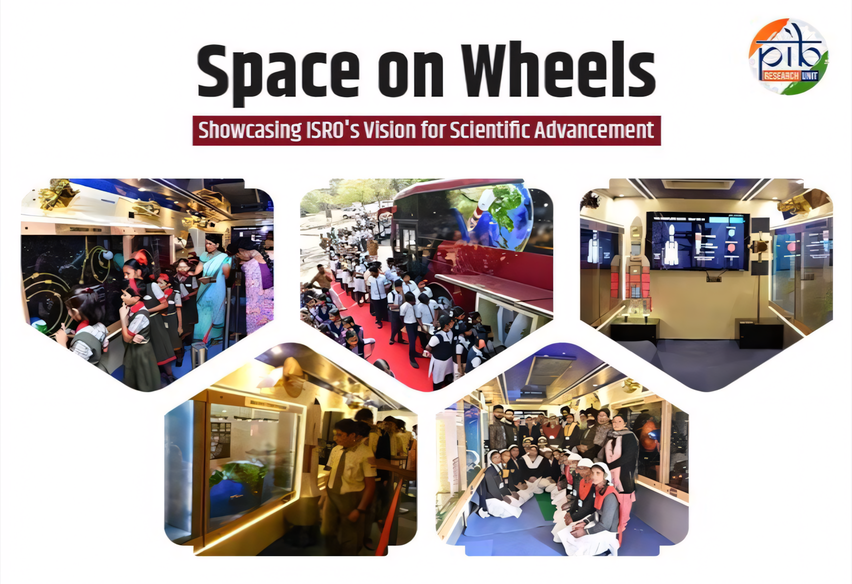
2024 NSpD Space on Wheels

This project involves mobile exhibition buses that will travel to various universities and colleges during National Space Day celebrations. On 24 January 2023, ISRO signed a Memorandum of Understanding (MoU) with a prominent science organisation Vijnana Bharati (VIBHA), which is dedicated to promoting scientific knowledge and awareness, to collaborate on a unique initiative called “Space on Wheels.”

The primary goal of this initiative is to disseminate information about ISRO's activities and India's space missions to school students across all states of India. This collaboration represents a joint effort between VIBHA and ISRO to enhance public understanding of space science and foster greater interest in space exploration.

=== ISRO Space Tutors: Engaging and Educating ===
Space Tutors are educators and mentors registered with ISRO who are dedicated to advancing space science and technology education. They play a crucial role in engaging students and the public through various outreach activities. In response to the evolving educational landscape, ISRO is committed to disseminating enriched knowledge in the space domain.

To support this, numerous NGOs and educational institutions have developed frameworks that encourage students to register and explore space science and technology. These frameworks include educational modules with books and lab work that complement regular classroom learning. Additionally, digital content creators and online educators use social media and mobile applications to offer virtual learning experiences.

ISRO's 120 registered Space Tutors will organize outreach events such as talks, quizzes, and exhibitions across the country, aiming to promote space education and raise awareness about space activities and applications. They will receive support through promotional materials to enhance their efforts in fostering scientific curiosity and innovative thinking among students.

=== Bharatiya Antariksh Hackathon ===
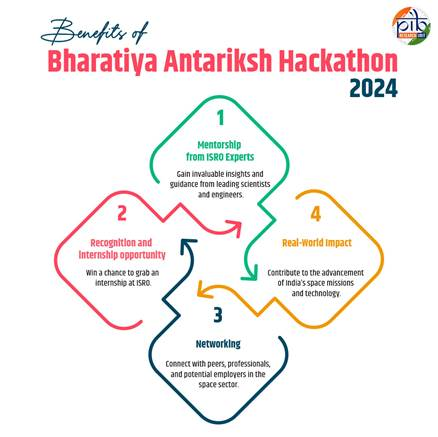
2024 NSpD Bharathiya Antariksh Hackathon

The Bharatiya Antariksh Hackathon 2024 is a key feature of the National Space Day-2024 celebrations, aiming to discover innovative ideas and solutions in Space Tech. As India continues to advance in space research and exploration, this premier event seeks to inspire the next generation of innovators to contribute to the nation's space missions.

Organized by ISRO, the national-level hackathon will present students with various problem statements, encouraging them to develop creative solutions. Teams will be shortlisted based on their responses to compete in the finale at selected centres.

Exceptional students from the finale will be offered internships at ISRO centres. The top three winners of the hackathon will have the opportunity to showcase their applications during the National Space Day celebrations on 23 August 2024.

=== ISRO Robotics Challenge ===
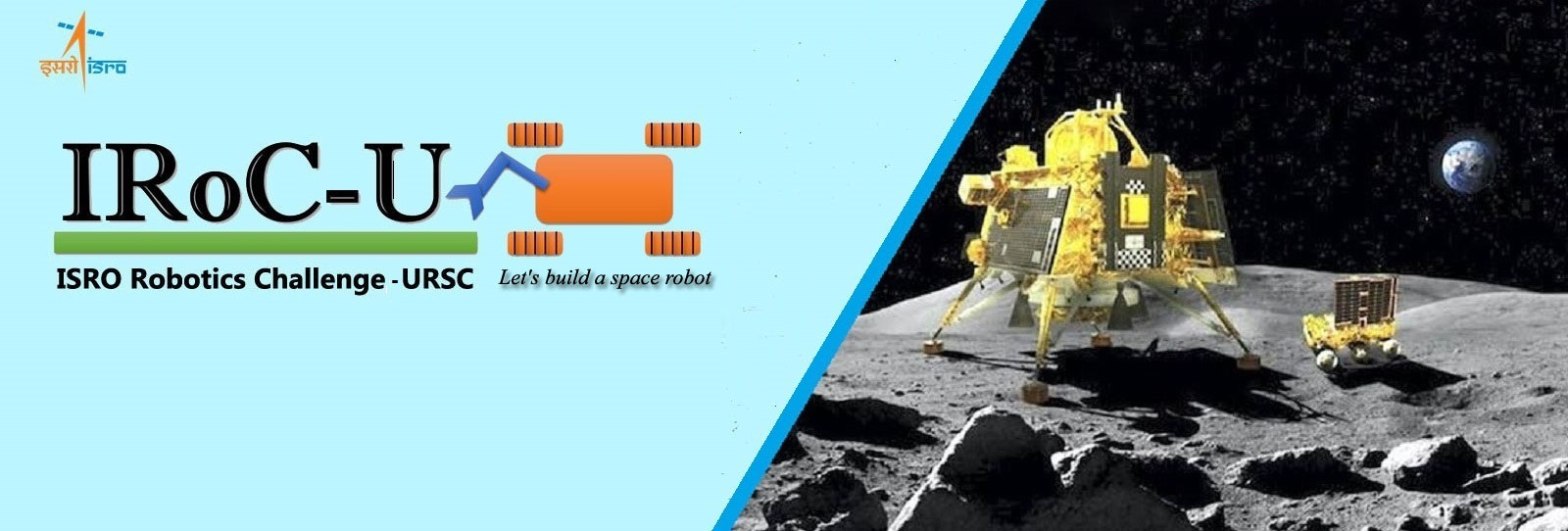
ISRO Robotics Challenge

The ISRO Robotics Challenge began on 8 November 2023, with an extended period for registration and proposal submissions. Following team selections and the release of competition details, participants showcased their hardware and rover functionality through video submissions and design reports.

With the tagline “Let's Build a Space Robot”, this challenge offers students a chance to engage in space robotics. Teams from institutions are tasked with creating robots for an extraterrestrial-inspired arena, addressing real-world space robotics challenges.
