= Indian Mars exploration missions =

Indian space missions aimed at Mars

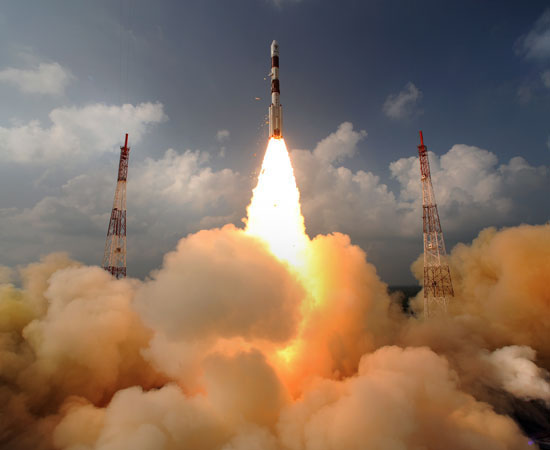
- PSLV-XL C25 lifts off with Mars Orbiter Mission on 5 November 2013.

Program overview
- Country: India
- Organization: ISRO
- Purpose: Exploration of Mars
- Status: Active

Programme history
- Cost: ₹454 crore (US$48 million)
- Duration: 2013–present
- First flight: Mars Orbiter Mission, 5 November 2013; 12 years ago
- Launch site: Satish Dhawan Space Centre

Vehicle information
- Launch vehicle: PSLV-XL

The Indian Mars exploration missions are an ongoing series of outer space missions by ISRO for the exploration of Mars. The exploration is currently in the primary phase with Orbiter missions.

There has been a single mission so far that deployed an orbiter around the planet which later lost its contact with the earth in 2022. A second mission planned for 2030 when the launch window opens.

== Mission ==
=== Orbiter ===
Mars Orbiter Mission

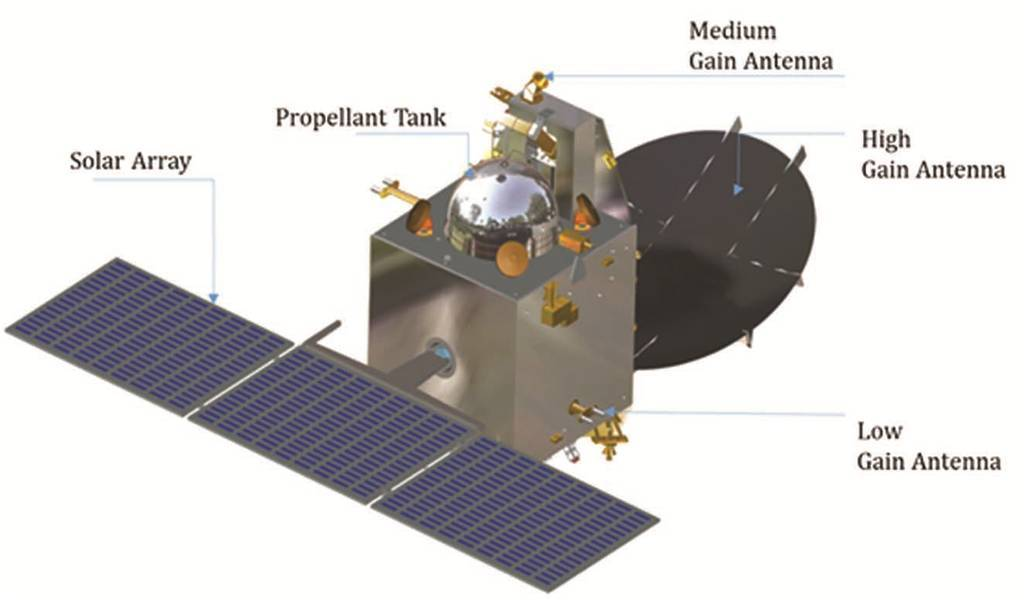
Diagram of Mars Orbiter Mission-1.

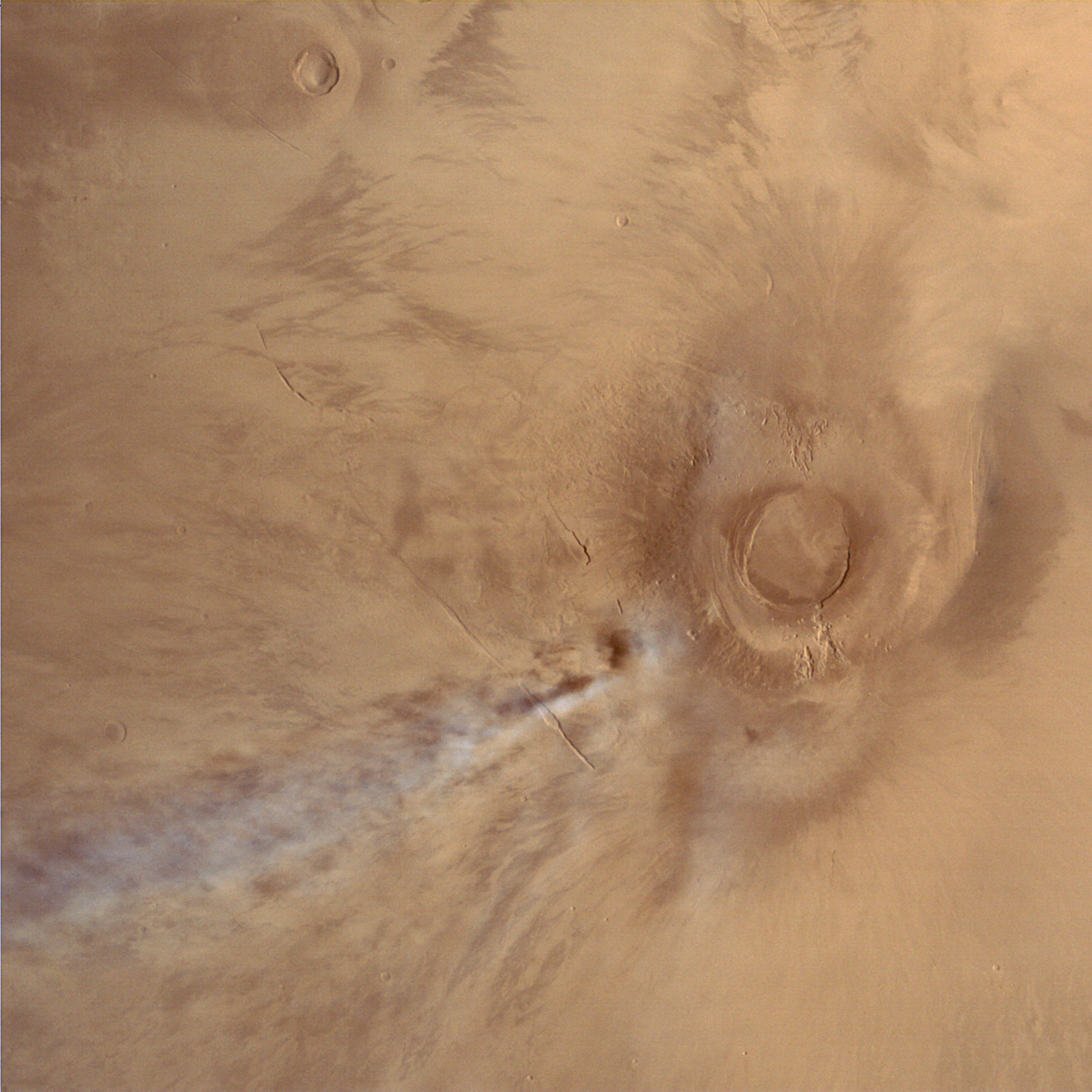
Region around Arsia Mons captured by MOM-1.

The first mission, which is also known as Mars Orbiter Mission (MOM) was launched in 2013 which carried Mars Orbiter Mission orbiter. The original mission was expected to operate for 6 months, but it lived well past its expected lifetime and lost its contact with the earth in 2022, lasting for over seven years.

=== Rovers and Rotocrafts ===
Mars Lander Mission

Mars Lander Mission is a proposed second Indian mission to Mars. Unlike the previous orbiter, it will operate in a lower orbit with Periareon and Apoareon altitude closer to the Martian surface. It will also carry greater scientific payload that includes a hyperspectral camera, a very high resolution panchromatic camera and a radar to better understand the early stages of Mars, its early crust, recent basalts, and ongoing activities such as boulder falls. Furthermore, ISRO has also conceptualized a Mars UAV Marble (Martian Boundary Layer Explorer), that will have a suite of payloads for aerial exploration of Mars. The aerial vehicle will be designed to be capable of flying up to 100 meters in the thin Martian air to profile the Martian atmosphere. It is planned to be a part of Mangalyaan 2 mission.

It will conduct a high-resolution vertical profiling of critical atmospheric parameters and perform first-of-its-kind in-situ measurements in the near-surface boundary layers of Mars. The payloads will include temperature sensor, humidity sensor, pressure sensor, wind speed sensor, electric field sensor, and the trace species and dust sensor to measure vertical distribution of dust aerosols. The information was shared by Jayadev Pradeep, a scientist with the Space Physics Laboratory at the Vikram Sarabhai Space Centre, during a webinar. The mission will also have a small rover.

== List of Missions ==
Mission

Successful and inactive
Active
Unsuccessful

Mission	Launch Date	Launch Vehicle	Orbital Insertion Date	Landing Date	Return Date	Status				
Mission	Launch Date	Launch Vehicle	Orbital Insertion Date	Landing Date	Return Date	Main Mission	Extended Mission	Expected Mission Duration	Final Mission Duration	Notes
Phase 1: Orbiters
Mars Orbiter Mission	5 November 2013	PSLV-XL	24 September 2014	–	–	Success	Success	6 months	7 years, 6 months, 8 days	First Indian interplanetary mission.
Mars Lander Mission	NET 2030	LVM3	TBD	–	–	TBD	TBD	1 year	TBD	Proposed Indian Mars lander mission.

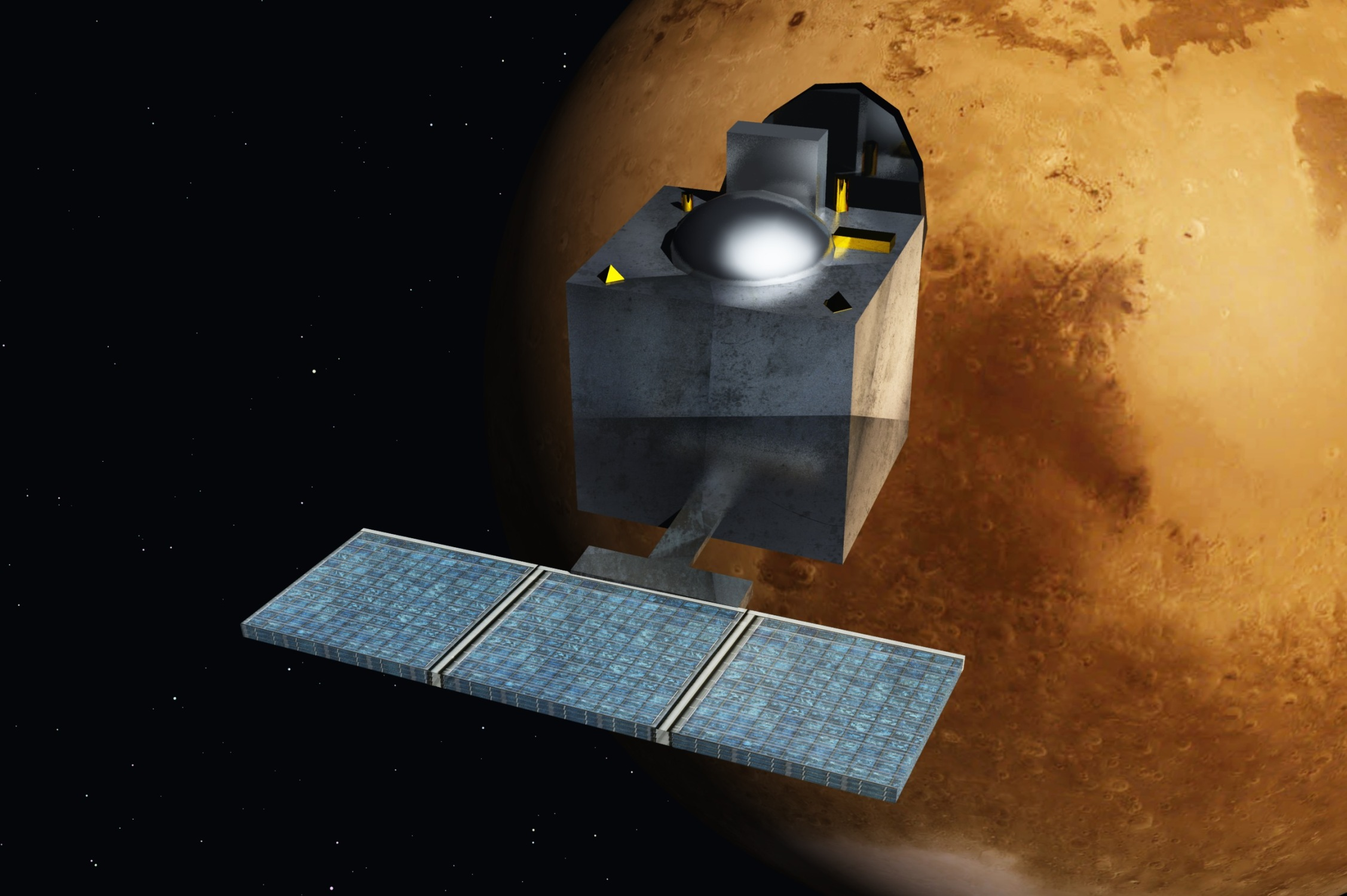
An artist's concept of MOM - 1 around Mars

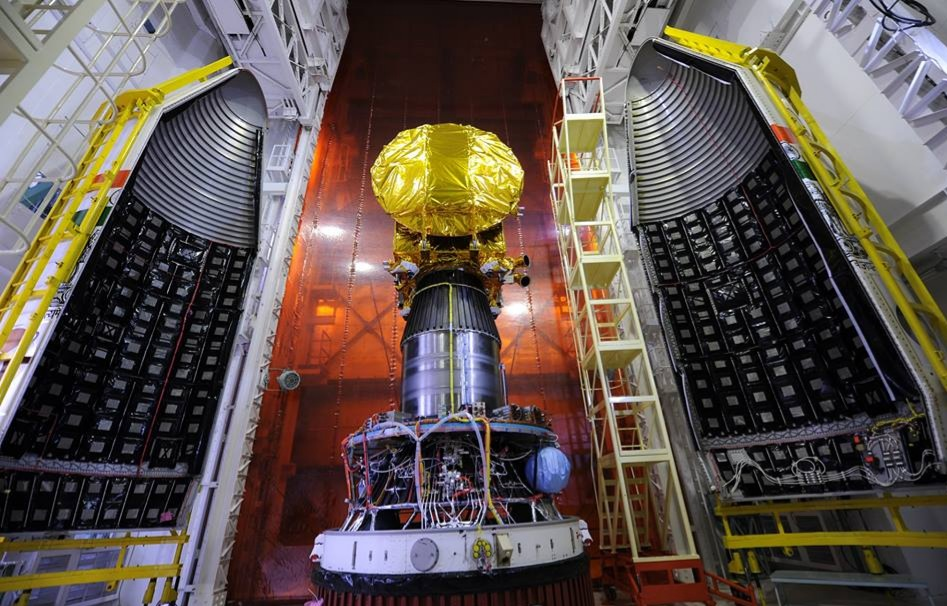
Spacecraft during encapsulation

== Gallery ==
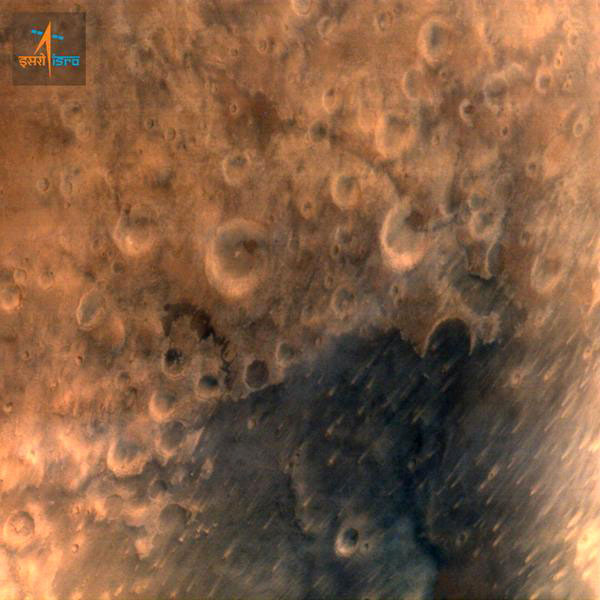
One of the first images of the surface of Mars taken by the MOM-1 on 25 September 2014.

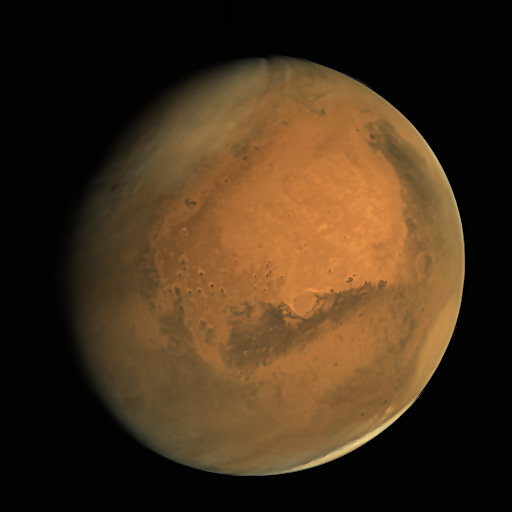
Dust storm on northern hemisphere of Mars as seen from MOM-1 on 28 September 2014.

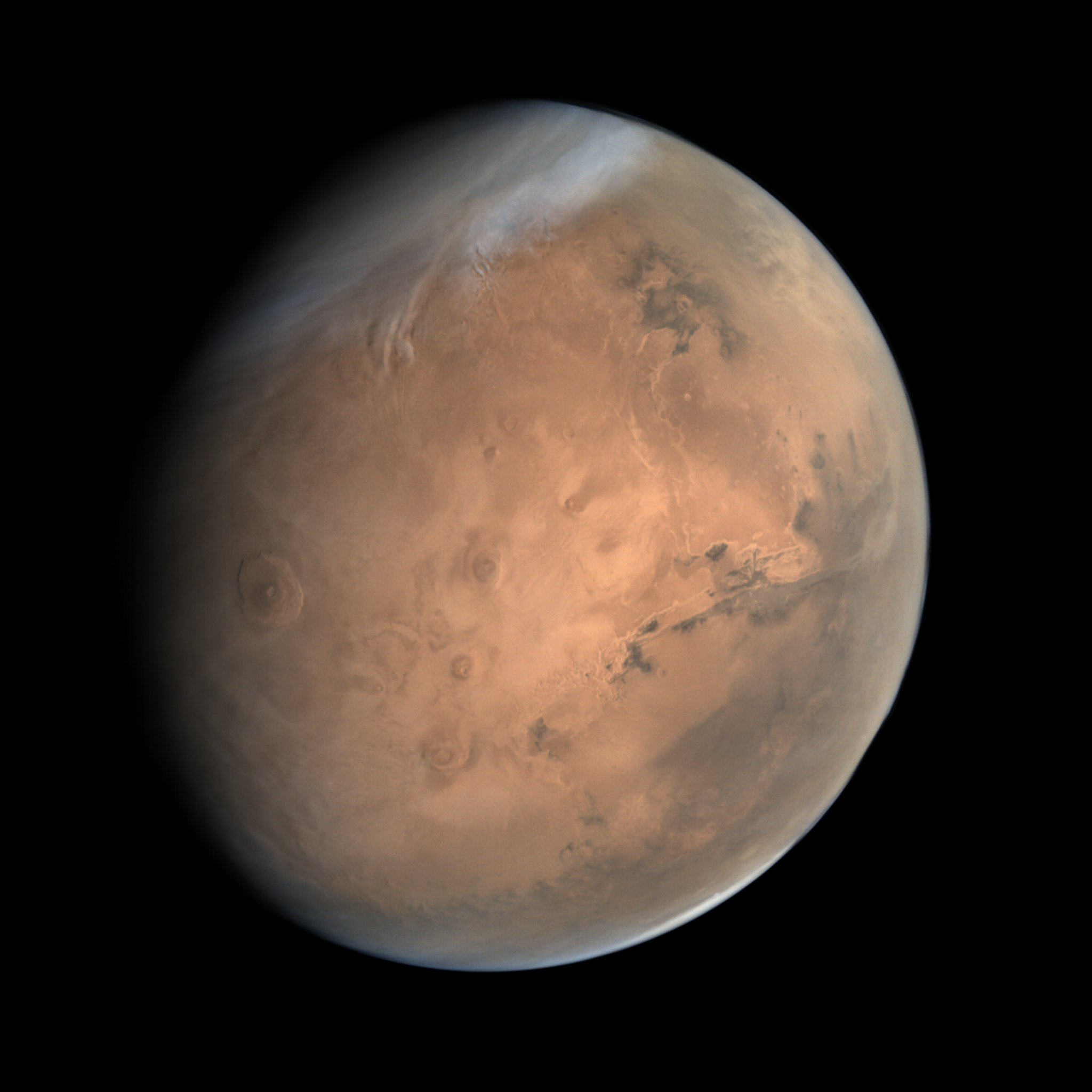
Tharsis and Valles Marineris as captured by MOM-1.

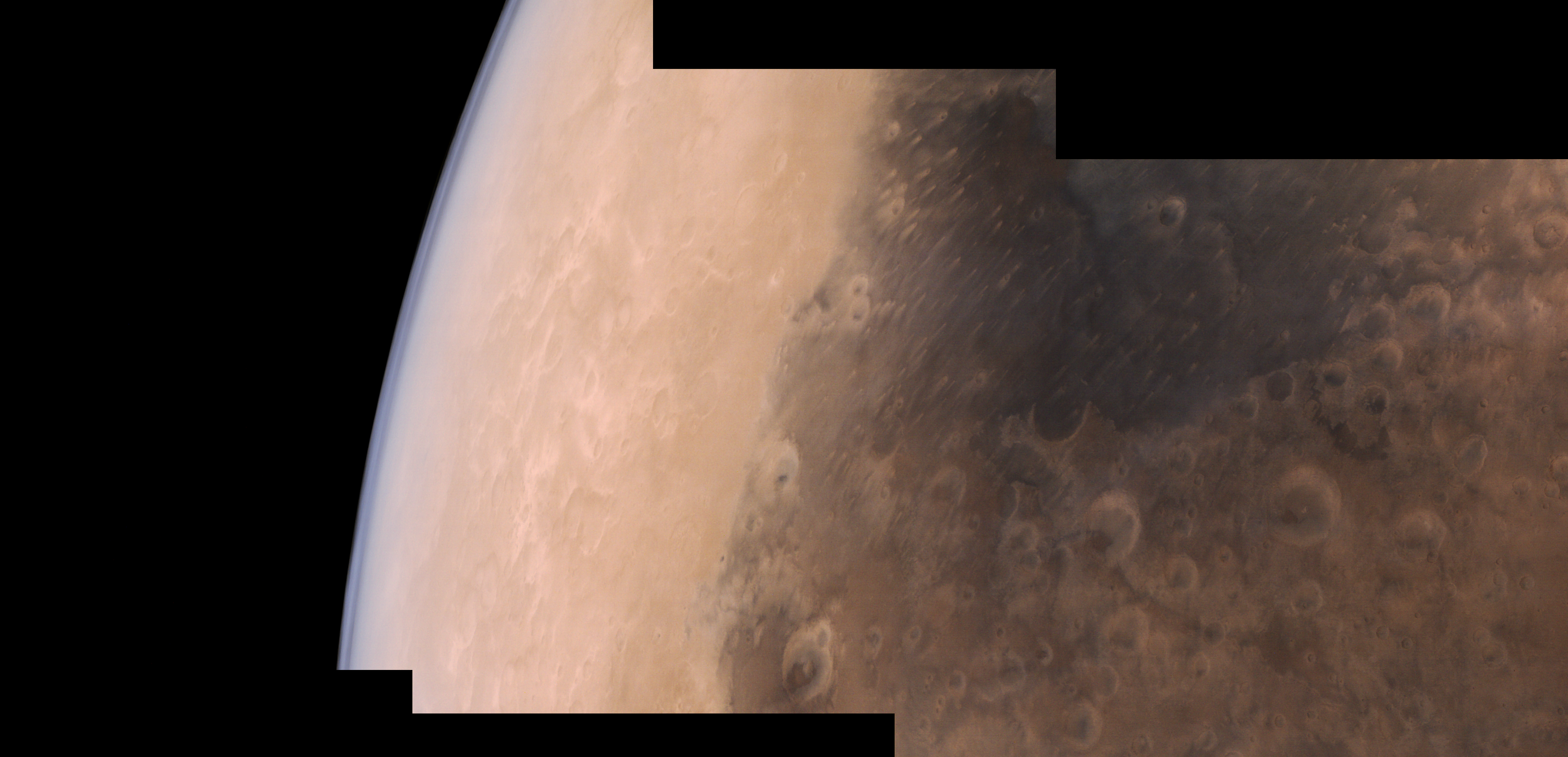
Syrtis Major by MOM-1.

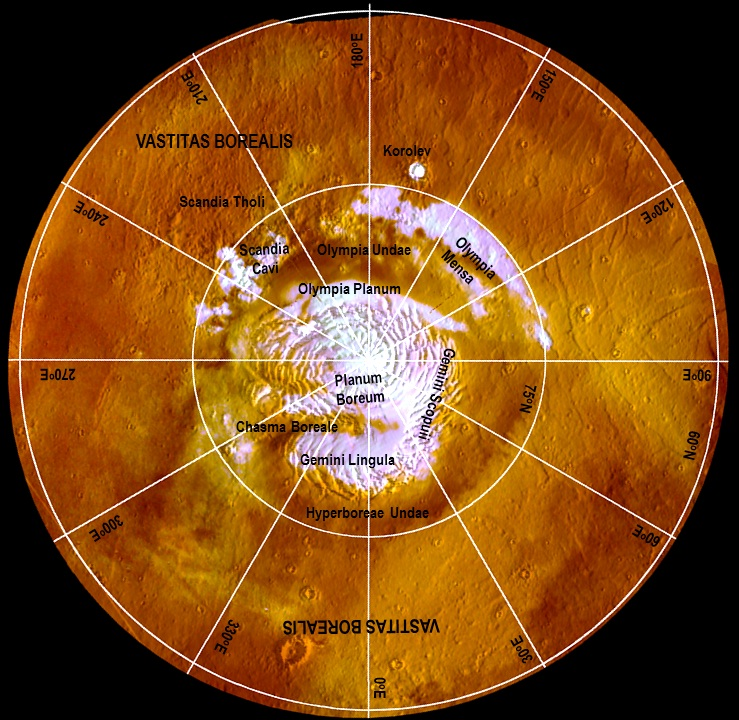
North pole of Mars by MOM-1.

See more on ISRO's website

== See also ==
- Chandrayaan programme
- Indian Human Spaceflight Programme
- List of missions to Mars
