= Mars Lander Mission =

India's second Martian mission

- Names: MLM
- Mission type: Mars Orbiter, Lander, Rover, Helicopter
- Operator: ISRO
- Mission duration: 1 year (proposed)

Spacecraft properties
- Bus: I-3K
- Manufacturer: U. R. Rao Satellite Centre
- Payload mass: ≈100 kg (220 lb)

Start of mission
- Launch date: NET 2030
- Rocket: PSLV-XL; LVM3
- Launch site: Satish Dhawan Space Centre
- Contractor: ISRO

Mars lander

Mars Lander Mission (MLM) (unofficially called Mangalyaan-2) is a proposed second mission to Mars by ISRO.

== History ==
Following the successful insertion of the Mars Orbiter Mission (also called Mangalyaan) into Martian orbit, ISRO announced its intent to launch a second mission to Mars at the Engineers Conclave conference held in Bengaluru on 28 October 2014. The proposed launch vehicle for this campaign is the LVM3, which flew for the first time on 5 June 2017, and might be powerful enough to place MOM on a direct-to-Mars trajectory alongside much heavier satellites, unlike the lighter Mars Orbiter Mission, which used a less powerful PSLV-XL rocket.

In January 2016, India and France signed a letter of intent for ISRO and CNES to jointly build MOM 2 by 2020, but by April 2018, France was not yet involved in the mission. The Indian government funded MOM 2 in its 2017 budget proposal, and ISRO was considering whether the best path would be to conduct an orbiter/lander/rover mission or to opt for only an orbiter with more sophisticated instruments than those flown on MOM. In a podcast recording, Vikram Sarabhai Space Centre director S. Somanath in October 2019 reported the architecture for mission was yet to be finalized and may also have a lander and rover, but no timeline was announced.

In February 2021, ISRO called for an 'Announcement of Opportunities' on MOM 2. In it, K. Sivan announced that Mangalyaan 2 will only be an orbiter mission. Being launched by the LVM3 rocket (formerly the GSLV mk III), and using Aerobraking the MOM-2 satellite can carry more than 7 times the payload for MOM-1, also with a reduction in perigee to about 200 kilometres (120 mi) above the surface of Mars.

In a recorded interview in October 2019, the Vikram Sarabhai Space Centre (VSSC) director indicated the possibility of inclusion of a lander, but in an interview to The Times of India in February 2021 the ISRO chairman clarified that the mission will consist solely of an orbiter. The orbiter will use aerobraking to lower its initial apoapsis and enter into an orbit more suitable for observations.

In 2024, the mission plan was updated, and now includes a rover, helicopter, sky crane and a supersonic parachute.

The Mission received approval from the Space Commission on 21 February 2025. Development of the Spacecraft is expected to begin after approval from the Union Cabinet.

== Development ==
An Announcement of Opportunity was released requesting submissions for scientific instruments for an orbiter only, with a deadline set for 20 September 2016. The total science payload mass is estimated at 100 kg (220 lb).

One of the science payloads under development is an ionosphere plasma instrument named ARIS. It is being developed by Space Satellite Systems and Payloads Centre (SSPACE), which is part of the Indian Institute of Space Science and Technology (IIST). The engineering model and high vacuum test have been completed.

In a panel discussion in September 2022, it was told that mission would include a hyperspectral camera, a very high resolution panchromatic camera and a radar to better understand the early stages of Mars, its early crust, recent basalts, and ongoing activities such as boulder falls.

== Spacecraft ==
The mission will consist of two modules, a Cruise Stage and a Descent Stage. The 4,500 kilograms (9,900 lb) spacecraft will initially be placed in an elliptical parking orbit of 190 by 35,786 kilometres (118 mi × 22,236 mi) around earth following launch from an LVM-3. The Cruise Stage will perform the trans-mars injection burn and set the stack towards Mars. Upon arrival, the Descent Stage will separate and perform the landing, skipping orbital insertion. The Cruise Stage will then enter into a Martian orbit using Aerobraking.

== Payloads ==
The mission will consist of four main payloads.

- Mars Orbit Dust Experiment (MODEX): It will measure the origin, abundance, distribution, and flux at high altitudes on Mars. There are no measurements of Interplanetary Dust Particles (IDPs) at Mars. The instrument can detect particles of size from a few hundred nm to few μm, travelling at hypervelocity (> 1 kilometre per second [0.62 mi/s]). The outcomes can help explain the dust flux at Mars, whether there is any ring (as hypothesized) around Mars and also confirm whether the dust is interplanetary or coming from Phobos or Deimos.
- Radio Occultation experiment (RO): It will measure neutral and electron Density profiles. The MODEX can help explain the RO experiment results. The instrument is a microwave transmitter operating at X-band frequency that can help understand the behaviour of the Martian atmosphere.
- Energetic Ion Spectrometer (EIS): It will study the solar energy particles and Supra-thermal solar wind on Mars. The data will be useful to understand the loss of Martian atmosphere.
- Langmuir probe and Electric Field Experiment (LPEX):It will measure the electron number, density, electron temperature and electric field waves. This experiment consists of one Langmuir probe (LP) and two electric field (EF) sensors each mounted on a long boom.
- PolaRisation sensitive Infrared Spectroscopy of Mars (PRISM):It is designed to measure the polarization of light from the Martian atmosphere using an Infrared Spectrometer, helping us understand dust and cloud properties.
- Plasma AnalyseR for the Environment of Mars (PREM): It is designed to analyze the composition of Mars' atmosphere by directly measuring its plasma content.

== See also ==
- Exploration of Mars
- List of missions to Mars
- Chandrayaan programme
