= List of Satish Dhawan Space Centre launches =

List of launches from an Indian spaceport

This page provides a list summary of the launches taken place in Satish Dhawan Space Centre. It is the main satellite launch centre for ISRO. It is located in Sriharikota, a coastal village in Tirupati district of Andhra Pradesh, 80 km (50 mi) north of Chennai. Originally called Sriharikota Range (SHAR), an acronym that ISRO has retained to the present day. The centre was renamed in 2002 after the death of ISRO's former chairman Satish Dhawan.

== Launch statistics ==
As of 24 December 2025, there have been a total of 104 launches from the three main orbital pads, (Note: Manually counting from the below given list of launches. All the stats given in this section have been found out using the same way.) including 88 successful launches, 5 partial successes, (Note: A partial success occurs when the payload is placed into an orbit where it was still usable even though the intended height or orbit was not reached, or which could be corrected with the spacecraft's own propulsion.) and 11 failed launches. In addition to this, an indefinite number of suborbital launches has taken place from the Sounding Rocket Complex.

=== By rocket ===
==== Orbital vehicles ====
- SLV: 4 (2 successful, 1 partial success, 1 failure)
- ASLV: 4 (1 successful, 1 partial success, 2 failures)
- PSLV: 63 (59 successful, 1 partial success, 3 failures)
- GSLV: 20 (14 successful, 2 partial success, 4 failures)
- LVM3: 9 (9 successful, 0 partial success, 0 failures)
- SSLV: 3 (2 successful, 0 partial success, 1 failure)
- Vikram-1: 1 (1 successful, 0 partial success, 0 failure)

==== Suborbital vehicles ====
- RLV-TD: 1 (1 successful)
- ATV: 3 (3 successful)
- Vikram-S: 1 (1 successful)
- TV-D1: 1 (1 successful)
- Agnibaan SOrTeD: 1 (1 successful)

=== By launch pad ===
SLV Launch Pad	8
First Launch Pad	55
Second Launch Pad	41
Sounding Rocket Complex	4
ALP Launch Pad	1

Total: 109

Success

Partial Success

Failure

Source: https://www.shar.gov.in/sdscshar/launchvehicles.jsp

(Launches from the Sounding Rocket Complex may be greater than 4)

- SLV Launch Pad: 8 (3 Failures, 2 partial success & 3 successful)
- First Launch Pad: 55 (3 Failures, 2 partial success & 50 successful)
- Second Launch Pad: 41 (5 Failures, 1 partial success & 35 successful)
- Sounding Rocket Complex: 4+ (0 Failures, 0 partial success & 4+ successful)
- ALP-01 (Dhanush) Launch Pad: 1 (0 Failures, 0 partial success & 1 successful)

=== By year ===
(Launches from the Sounding Rocket Complex and ALP-01 Launch Pad are not included)

== List of launches by pad ==
=== SLV Launch Pad ===
#	Launch date	Launch vehicle & variant	Version / Serial	Result	Notes
1	10 August 1979	SLV-3	D1	Failure	Faulty valve and wrong assessment causes vehicle to crash into the Bay of Bengal (317 s after takeoff), Developmental Flight.
2	18 July 1980	SLV-3	D2	Success	Developmental Flight.
3	31 May 1981	SLV-3	D3	Partial Success	Did not reach intended height. Satellite only orbits for 9 days, Developmental Flight.
4	17 April 1983	SLV-3	D4	Success	Developmental Flight.
5	24 March 1987	ASLV	D1	Failure	First stage did not ignite after strap-on burnout, Developmental Flight.
6	13 July 1988	ASLV	D2	Failure	Insufficient control gain, Developmental Flight.
7	20 May 1992	ASLV	D3	Partial Success	Lower than expected orbit and incorrect spin-stabilisation, payload decayed quickly.
8	4 May 1994	ASLV	D4	Success	SROSS-C2 launched.

=== First Launch Pad ===
#	Launch date	Launch Vehicle & Variant	Version / Serial	Result	Notes
1	20 September 1993	PSLV	D1	Failure	Unexpected large disturbance at the second stage separation resulting in a sub-orbital flight of the vehicle. One of the retro rockets designed to pull the burnt second stage away from the third stage failed leading to loss of rocket and payload (IRS-1E).
2	15 October 1994	PSLV	D2	Success	With the successful launch, India became the sixth country in the world to launch satellite (IRS-P2) in low-Earth orbit.
3	21 March 1996	PSLV	D3	Success	Third developmental test flight, PSLV placed the 922 kg IRS-P3 satellite in the intended 817 km polar orbit.
4	29 September 1997	PSLV	C1	Partial Success	PSLV's first operational flight, placed IRS-1D into a polar orbit. However, it did not place the satellite in the desired circular orbit of 817 km, but in an elliptical orbit due to a leak of helium gas from one of the components.
5	26 May 1999	PSLV	C2	Success	Carried IRS-P4/Oceansat-1, South Korea's KITSAT-3 and DLR-TUBSAT. PSLV's first commercial launch and also was for the first time an Indian launch vehicle carried multiple satellites.
6	18 April 2001	GSLV Mk I(a)	D1	Partial Success	Developmental Flight, payload (GSAT-1) placed into lower than planned orbit, and did not have sufficient fuel to reach a usable orbit.
7	22 October 2001	PSLV	C3	Success	Placed three satellites in orbit - TES of India, PROBA (PRoject for On Board Autonomy) of the European Space Agency and the BIRD (Bispectral and Infrared Remote Detection) of the German Aerospace Centre.
8	12 September 2002	PSLV	C4	Success	Launch of Kalpana-1. India's first launch to place a satellite into a Geosynchronous Transfer Orbit. The flight path of PSLV-C4 was specially modified to inject the satellite into a Geosynchronous Transfer Orbit having a perigee 250 km and an apogee of 36,000 km.
9	8 May 2003	GSLV Mk I(a)	D2	Success	Developmental Flight
10	17 October 2003	PSLV	C5	Success	Payload capability had been progressively increased by more than 600 kg since the first PSLV launch. Launch took place despite heavy rain.
11	20 September 2004	GSLV Mk I(b)	F01	Success	First operational flight
12	10 January 2007	PSLV	C7	Success	For the first time, a Dual Launch Adapter (DLA) was used in the PSLV to accommodate two primary satellites at the same time. Space capsule Recovery Experiment (SRE-1) also launched. The SRE-1 module remained in orbit for 12 days before re-entering the Earth's atmosphere and splashing down into the Bay of Bengal on 22 January 2007. The re-capture of the SRE-1 module made India the fourth country to do so after the US, Russia and China.
13	21 January 2008	PSLV-CA	C10	Success	Launch of TECSAR. An Israeli reconnaissance satellite, and first flight of PSLV to launch a satellite into an elliptical orbit with medium inclination.
14	23 September 2009	PSLV-CA	C14	Success	7 satellites launched. SwissCube-1 and ITUpSAT1, Switzerland's and Turkey's first home-grown satellites launched into space.
15	12 July 2010	PSLV-CA	C15	Success	Main satellite Cartosat-2B and Algeria's Alsat-2A along with AISSat-1 by UTIAS, TISat-1 by SUPSI, and StudSat. TIsat-1 is the second ever Swiss satellite launched into Space. AISSat-1 and TISat-1 are part of NLS-6.
16	20 April 2011	PSLV	C16	Success	The standard version, with six solid strap-on booster motors strung around the first stage, was used. ResourceSat-2 launched.
17	12 October 2011	PSLV-CA	C18	Success	The Megha-Tropiques satellite for climate research launched along with three microsatellites: SRMSAT, the remote sensing satellite Jugnu and the VesselSat-1 to locate ships on high seas.
18	26 April 2012	PSLV-XL	C19	Success	Radar Imaging Satellite-1 (RISAT-1) launched.
19	9 September 2012	PSLV-CA	C21	Success	ISRO's 100th mission.
20	25 February 2013	PSLV-CA	C20	Success	Indo-French SARAL and six other foreign satellites launched.
21	1 July 2013	PSLV-XL	C22	Success	Launch of IRNSS-1A, the first satellite of the Indian Regional Navigation Satellite System.
22	5 November 2013	PSLV-XL	C25	Success	Mars Orbiter Mission or Mangalyaan, India's first mission to Mars.
23	4 April 2014	PSLV-XL	C24	Success	IRNSS-1B, the second out of seven in the Indian Regional Navigation Satellite System (IRNSS) launched.
24	30 June 2014	PSLV-CA	C23	Success	Five foreign satellites including France's SPOT-7 launched.
25	16 October 2014	PSLV-XL	C26	Success	IRNSS-1C, the third out of seven in the Indian Regional Navigation Satellite System (IRNSS) launched.
26	10 July 2015	PSLV-XL	C28	Success	UK-DMC 3 and two other foreign satellites launched. Heaviest ever commercial launch mission undertaken by ISRO.
27	28 September 2015	PSLV-XL	C30	Success	Launch of India's first dedicated astronomy satellite Astrosat and ISRO's first launch of US satellites.
28	16 December 2015	PSLV-CA	C29	Success	Commercial launch of 6 Singaporean satellites. Fourth stage re-ignition demonstrated successfully after payload deployment.
29	28 April 2016	PSLV-XL	C33	Success	IRNSS-1G, the last out of seven in the Indian Regional Navigation Satellite System (IRNSS) launched.
30	23 May 2016	RLV-TD	HEX 01	Success	Suborbital. RLV-TD is one of the most technologically challenging endeavors of ISRO towards developing essential technologies for a fully reusable launch vehicle to enable low cost access to space.
31	26 September 2016	PSLV	C35	Success	First mission of PSLV to launch its payloads into two different orbits. Launch of ScatSat-1, 5 foreign and 2 student satellites.
32	7 December 2016	PSLV-XL	C36	Success	Launch of Resourcesat-2A. First mission of PSLV to use India's own regional navigation system (NavIC) to navigate PSLV.
33	15 February 2017	PSLV-XL	C37	Success	Successfully carried and deployed a record 104 satellites including Cartosat-2D in the polar Sun-synchronous orbit.
34	23 June 2017	PSLV-XL	C38	Success	Simultaneous launch of 31 satellites including 29 foreign satellites, 1 student satellite and Cartosat-2E.
35	12 January 2018	PSLV-XL	C40	Success	Simultaneous launch of 31 satellites including 28 foreign satellites and ISRO's 100th satellite Cartosat-2F.
36	11 April 2018	PSLV-XL	C41	Success	Launch of IRNSS-1I, the ninth satellite of Indian Regional Navigation Satellite System (IRNSS).
37	16 September 2018	PSLV-CA	C42	Success	Launch of NovaSAR and S1-4 of Surrey Satellite Technology
38	24 January 2019	PSLV-DL	C44	Success	Launch of Microsat-R and Kalamsat.
39	1 April 2019	PSLV-QL	C45	Success	Launch of EMISAT and 28 foreign satellites.
40	22 May 2019	PSLV-CA	C46	Success	Launch of RISAT-2B.
41	11 December 2019	PSLV-QL	C48	Success	Launch of 9 Commercial Satellites and RISAT-2BR1.
42	7 November 2020	PSLV-DL	C49	Success	Launch of 9 Commercial Satellites and EOS-01.
43	28 February 2021	PSLV-DL	C51	Success	Launch of Amazonia-1 and 13 commercial satellites.
44	14 February 2022	PSLV-XL	C52	Success	Launch of EOS-4/RISAT-1A, INSPIRESat-1 and INS-2TD.
45	7 August 2022	SSLV	D1	Failure	First demonstration flight of SSLV which carried the satellite payloads EOS-02 and AzaadiSAT. Due to sensor failure coupled with shortcomings of onboard software, the stage as well as the two satellite payloads were injected into an unstable elliptical orbit, and subsequently destroyed upon reentry.
46	26 November 2022	PSLV-XL	C54	Success	Launch of the EOS-06/Oceansat-3 satellite and 8 commercial cubesats.
47	10 February 2023	SSLV	D2	Success	Launch of EOS-07 and two other satellites
48	22 April 2023	PSLV-CA	C55	Success	Commercial launch for Singapore's TeLEOS-2 satellite.
49	30 July 2023	PSLV-CA	C56	Success	Commercial launch for Singapore's DS-SAR satellite.
50	21 October 2023	TV-D1	Test Vehicle Abort Mission-1	Success	Suborbital. High altitude abort test for the Gaganyaan crew spacecraft.
51	1 January 2024	PSLV-DL	C58	Success	Launch of the XPoSat scientific mission
52	16 August 2024	SSLV	D3	Success	Launch of EOS-08 and SR-0 DEMOSAT passenger satellite
53	5 December 2024	PSLV-XL	C59	Success	Launch of Proba-3 dual probes
54	30 December 2024	PSLV-CA	C60	Success	Launch of SPADEX Chaser and Target dual probes
55	18 May 2025	PSLV-XL	C61	Failure	Launch of EOS-09. Performance was nominal till 2nd Stage, an "observation" in 3rd Stage led to mission failure. It was later clarified by ISRO Chairman that the "observation" was "less chamber pressure". While other sources suspect that the flex nozzle control system was at fault.
56	12 January 2026	PSLV-DL	C62	Failure	The mission was launched on 12 January 2026 with multiple payloads for customers but failed to reach orbit. It has been presumed crashed near 75°E, 18°S over the Southern Indian Ocean.
57	18 July 2026	Vikram-1	Aagaman	Success	Maiden flight of Vikram-1. Cosmoserve Space's robotic arm Embrace and an on-orbit demonstration from German company DCUBED were hosted on the upper stage of the mission. The rocket successfully reached the orbit in its first attempt.

=== Second Launch Pad ===
#	Launch date	Launch Vehicle & Variant	Version / Serial	Result	Notes
1	5 May 2005	PSLV	C6	Success	First launch from the Second Launch Pad, inaugurated on the immediately preceding day. After its integration in the Vehicle Assembly Building, the PSLV-C6 was transported on rails to the Umbilical Tower (UT) located 1 km away using the Mobile Launch Pedestal where the final operations were carried out. It carried CARTOSAT-1 and HAMSAT
2	10 July 2006	GSLV Mk I(b)	F02	Failure	Both rocket and satellite (INSAT-4C) had to be destroyed over the Bay of Bengal after the rocket's trajectory veered outside permitted limits.
3	23 April 2007	PSLV-CA	C8	Success	Launch of ASI's AGILE astronomical satellite. First flight of the 'Core-Alone' version. ISRO's first exclusively commercial launch.
4	2 September 2007	GSLV Mk I(b)	F04	Partial Success	Successful Launch, apogee lower and inclination higher than expected, due to minor error in guidance subsystem. Eventually the 2160 kg payload reached the designated geostationary transfer orbit.
5	28 April 2008	PSLV-CA	C9	Success	Rocket put 10 satellites into orbit in a precisely timed sequence, highest by any Indian launch vehicle. Two satellites belonged to India and the remaining were very small ones built by universities in different countries.
6	22 October 2008	PSLV-XL	C11	Success	First flight of the PSLV-XL version. Carried Chandrayaan-1, India's first mission to the Moon launched.
7	20 April 2009	PSLV-CA	C12	Success	India's first all-weather radar imaging reconnaissance satellite RISAT-2 launched.
8	15 April 2010	GSLV	D3	Failure	Launch of GSAT-4. First flight test of the ISRO designed and built Cryogenic Upper Stage. Failed to reach orbit due to malfunction of Fuel Booster Turbo Pump (FBTP) of the Cryogenic Upper Stage.
9	25 December 2010	GSLV Mk I(c)	D4	Failure	First flight of GSLV Mk.I (c) Destroyed by range safety officer after loss of control of liquid fuelled boosters.
10	15 July 2011	PSLV-XL	C17	Success	Indigenously developed flight computer 'Vikram' used for the first time. GSAT-12 launched.
11	5 January 2014	GSLV	D5	Success	Launch of GSLV with indigenously built cryogenic engine and carrying GSAT-14 satellite.
12	18 December 2014	LVM3	X	Success	Sub-orbital development test flight. It carried the CARE module.
13	28 March 2015	PSLV-XL	C27	Success	IRNSS-1D, the fourth out of seven in the Indian Regional Navigation Satellite System (IRNSS) launched.
14	27 August 2015	GSLV	D6	Success	GSAT-6 launched and second successful launch of GSLV with indigenous cryogenic upper stage (CE-7.5).
15	20 January 2016	PSLV-XL	C31	Success	IRNSS-1E, the fifth out of seven in the Indian Regional Navigation Satellite System (IRNSS) launched.
16	10 March 2016	PSLV-XL	C32	Success	IRNSS-1F, the sixth out of seven in the Indian Regional Navigation Satellite System (IRNSS) launched.
17	22 June 2016	PSLV-XL	C34	Success	Simultaneous launch of 20 satellites including 17 foreign satellites, 2 student satellites and Cartosat-2C.
18	8 September 2016	GSLV	F05	Success	First operational flight of GSLV Mk II with indigenous CUS carrying INSAT-3DR.
19	5 May 2017	GSLV	F09	Success	Launch of GSAT-9 / South Asia Satellite.
20	5 June 2017	LVM3	D1	Success	First orbital test launch of GSLV Mk. III with a functional cryogenic stage. Launch of GSAT-19 satellite.
21	31 August 2017	PSLV-XL	C39	Failure	Payload fairing (heat shield) failed to separate, causing the IRNSS-1H satellite to remain inside the fairing with the payload dispenser detaching the satellite internally.
22	29 March 2018	GSLV	F08	Success	Launch of GSAT-6A using an enhanced version of the Vikas engine called High Thrust Vikas Engine (HTVE) which had a thrust of 848 kN in GS2 stage.
23	14 November 2018	LVM3	D2	Success	Launch of GSAT-29.
24	29 November 2018	PSLV-CA	C43	Success	Launch of HySIS and 30 commercial satellites.
25	19 December 2018	GSLV	F11	Success	Launch of GSAT-7A.
26	22 July 2019	LVM3	M1	Success	Launch of Chandrayaan-2.
27	27 November 2019	PSLV-XL	C47	Success	Launch of Cartosat-3.
28	17 December 2020	PSLV-XL	C50	Success	Launch of CMS-01.
29	12 August 2021	GSLV	F10	Failure	Launch of EOS-03. Cryogenic upper stage failure resulted in mission failure.
30	30 June 2022	PSLV-CA	C53	Success	Launch of DS-EO electro-optical satellite and two other small satellites from Singapore. It also carried the PSLV Orbital Experiment Module (POEM-1) that is attached to upper stage to carry in-orbit experiments and carries 6 hosted payloads.
31	22 October 2022	LVM3	M2	Success	Carried 36 OneWeb Satellites. First commercial launch of LVM 3.It is the heaviest payload that is launched by a LVM 3 and ISRO to date.
32	26 March 2023	LVM3	M3	Success	It carried 36 OneWeb Satellites. Second commercial launch of LVM 3.
33	29 May 2023	GSLV	F12	Success	Launch of NVS-01 navigation satellite.
34	14 July 2023	LVM3	M4	Success	Launch of Chandrayaan-3 lunar exploration mission.
35	2 September 2023	PSLV-XL	C57	Success	Launch of Aditya-L1 scientific mission
36	17 February 2024	GSLV	F14	Success	Launch of INSAT-3DS weather satellite
37	29 January 2025	GSLV	F15	Success	Launch of NVS-02 navigation satellite.
38	30 July 2025	GSLV	F16	Success	Launch of NISAR navigation satellite. first joint mission between NASA and ISRO first free-flying space mission to feature two radar instruments first time the two agencies have co-developed hardware for an Earth-observing mission.
39	2 November 2025	LVM3	M5	Success	Launch Of GSAT-7R (CMS-03) Communication Satellite
40	24 December 2025	LVM3	M6	Success	Launch of Bluebird Block 2 communications satellite.
41	4 September 2026	GSLV	F17	Success	Launch of EOS-05 Earth observation satellite.
42	30 October 2026	GSLV	F18	Success	Launch of NVS-03 navigation satellite.

=== Sounding Rocket Complex ===
#	Launch date	Launch Vehicle & Variant	Version / Serial	Result	Notes
1	3 March 2010	ATV	D01	Success	Carried a passive scramjet engine combustor module
2	28 August 2016	ATV	D02	Success	The first experimental mission of ISRO's Scramjet Engine towards the realisation of an Air Breathing Propulsion System
3	18 November 2022	Vikram-S	Prarambh	Success	Carried 3 customer payloads. It was a India's First Private Rocket launch by Skyroot Aerospace
4	22 July 2024	ATV	D03	Success	Demonstration of Air Breathing Propulsion Technology

=== ALP-01 (Dhanush) Launch Pad ===
#	Launch date	Launch Vehicle & Variant	Version / Serial	Result	Notes
1	30 May 2024	Agnibaan SOrTeD	Agnibaan SOrTeD	Success	Suborbital technology demonstrator from a privately built launch pad. Carried a mass simulator up to a height of 60 km (37 mi).

== Planned launches ==
Launch date	Launch pad	Launch Vehicle	Version/ Serial	Payload
By Q1 2026	Second	GSLV	F17	IRNSS-1L
By Q1 2026	Second	GSLV	F18	GISAT-1A / EOS-05
By Q1 2026	First	PSLV	N1	TDS-01
By Q1 2026	First	SSLV	L1	TBD / PARIKSHIT

== Other test activities by ISRO ==
Launch date	Launch pad	Launch Vehicle & Variant	Version / Serial	Result	Notes
5 July 2018	-	ISRO Pad Abort Test	PAT	Success	Crew Escape System along with the simulated crew module with a mass of 12.6 tonnes, lifted off at 07.00 AM (IST) at the opening of the launch window from its pad at Satish Dhawan Space Centre, Sriharikota.

== See also ==
- List of SSLV Launch Complex launches
