= NVS-01 =

Indian navigation satellite

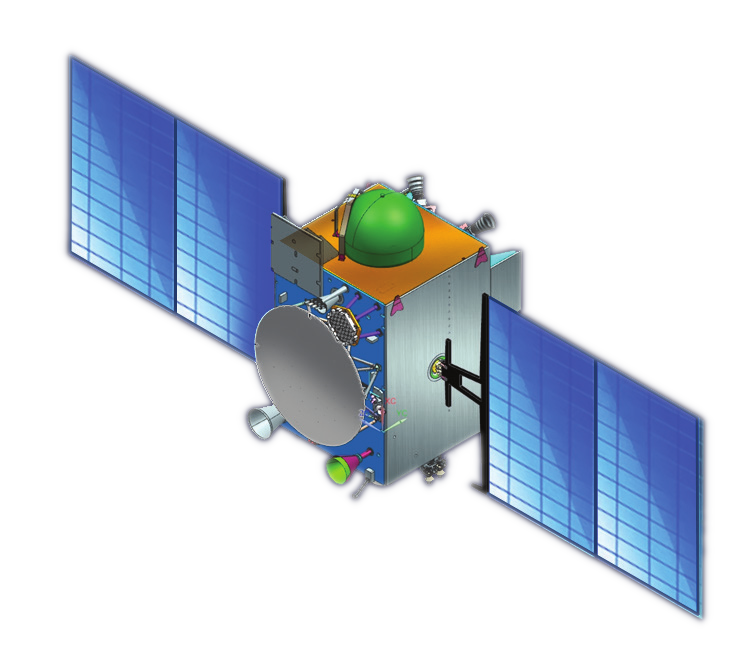
- NVS series spacecraft
- Mission type: Navigation
- Operator: ISRO
- COSPAR ID: 2023-076A
- SATCAT no.: 56759
- Mission duration: Planned: 12 years Elapsed: 3 years, 5 months, 14 days

Spacecraft properties
- Bus: I-2K
- Manufacturer: ISRO Satellite Centre; Space Applications Centre
- Launch mass: 2,232 kilograms (4,921 lb)

Start of mission
- Launch date: 29 May 2023, 16:10 UTC
- Rocket: GSLV, F12
- Launch site: Satish Dhawan, SLP
- Contractor: ISRO

Orbital parameters
- Reference system: Geocentric
- Regime: Geosynchronous
- Longitude: 129.55° East
- Inclination: 5.1°

NVS-01 is the first in the series of second generation navigation satellite (NVS) and the tenth satellite in the Indian Regional Navigation Satellite System (IRNSS), with an alternate name of, IRNSS-1J. It will augment the existing satellite and bolster the capability of the NavIC constellation by adding more robustness and new features. ISRO already launched IRNSS 1A, 1B, 1C, 1D, 1E, 1F, 1G, 1H and 1I. The satellite is intended to replace IRNSS-1G and augment the constellation of geosynchronous navigation satellites after IRNSS-1I.

== Payload ==
NVS-01 has two types of payloads, navigation payload and the ranging payload. The navigation payload transmits navigation service signals to the users. This payload is operating in L1 band, L5 band and S band. A highly stable Rubidium atomic clock is part of the navigation payload of the satellite. Failure of the imported Rubidium atomic clocks across the fleet of previous generation of satellite led to the creation of an indigenous option. NVS-01 is the first navigation satellite to host the indigenous clock.

The ranging payload consists of transponder which is operated in CDMA mode for two-way range measurements. The IRNSS satellites continuously emits time stamped navigation signals, which are received by the ground-based user receivers. The information is then processed by the receivers to derive their own position, velocity and time. The system provides seamless, uninterrupted services under all weather conditions.

The new generation of navigation satellite features a new and improved encryption system for bolstering the communication of the satellite specially for the restricted users.

== Satellite ==
The satellite will help in maintaining the continuity that was lagging due to the failure of Rubidium Atomic clocks in previous satellites whilst bolstering the feature set with new bands and longer life. The Indian Regional Navigation Satellite System space segment consists of seven satellites. With the new series of satellites, ISRO aims to tap into the low power satellite navigation segment like Smart Watches and fitness trackers whilst cementing its Navigation system by allowing it to seamlessly integrate and interoperate with the existing Navigation system. The inclusion of the civilian L1 band will further bolsters Indian Regional Navigation Satellite System position in the mass market.

== Launch ==
NVS-01 was successfully launched by 15th flight of GSLV (GSLV-F12) in Mk2 configuration on 29 May 2023 with a flight-off mass of 2,232 kilograms (4,921 lb) and successfully placed into orbit.

Animation of IRNSS

Around the Earth

Around the Earth - Polar view

Earth fixed frame - Equatorial view, front

Earth fixed frame - Equatorial view, side

Earth fixed frame - Polar view

Earth · IRNSS-1B · IRNSS-1C · IRNSS-1E · IRNSS-1F · IRNSS-1G · IRNSS-1I

== See also ==
- Communication-Centric Intelligence Satellite (CCI-Sat)
- GPS-aided geo-augmented navigation (GAGAN)
- Satellite navigation
