= Earth-centered inertial =

Coordinate frames

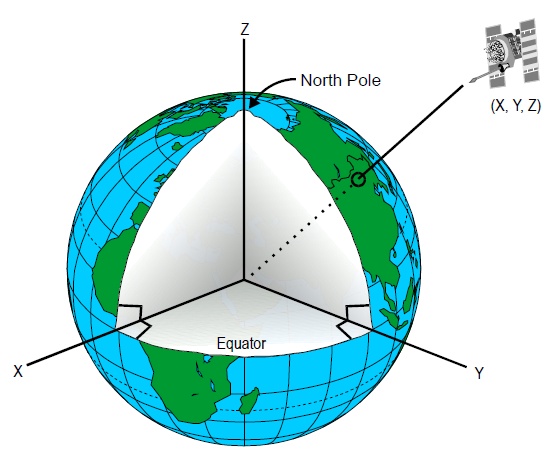
To show a location about Earth using the ECI system, Cartesian coordinates are used. The x–y plane coincides with the equatorial plane of Earth. The x-axis is permanently fixed in a direction relative to the celestial sphere, which does not rotate as Earth does. The z-axis lies at a 90° angle to the equatorial plane and extends through the North Pole. Due to forces that the Sun and Moon exert, Earth's equatorial plane moves with respect to the celestial sphere. Earth rotates while the ECI coordinate system does not.

Earth-centered inertial (ECI) coordinate frames have their origins at the center of mass of Earth and do not rotate with respect to the stars. "I" in "ECI" stands for inertial (i.e. "not accelerating"), in contrast to the "Earth-centered – Earth-fixed" (ECEF) frames, which remains fixed with respect to Earth's surface in its rotation, and then rotates with respect to stars.

For objects in space, the equations of motion that describe orbital motion are simpler in a non-rotating frame such as ECI. The ECI frame is also useful for specifying the direction toward celestial objects:

To represent the positions and velocities of terrestrial objects, it is convenient to use ECEF coordinates or latitude, longitude, and altitude.

In a nutshell:

- ECI: inertial, not rotating, with respect to the stars; useful to describe motion of celestial bodies and spacecraft.
- ECEF: not inertial, accelerated, rotating with respect to the stars; useful to describe motion of objects on Earth surface.

The extent to which an ECI frame is actually inertial is limited by the non-uniformity of the surrounding gravitational field. For example, the Moon's gravitational influence on a high-Earth orbiting satellite is significantly different than its influence on Earth, so observers in an ECI frame would have to account for this acceleration difference in their laws of motion. The closer the observed object is to the ECI-origin, the less significant the effect of the gravitational disparity is.

== Coordinate system definitions ==
It is convenient to define the orientation of an ECI frame using the Earth's orbit plane and the orientation of the Earth's rotational axis in space. The Earth's orbit plane is called the ecliptic, and it does not coincide with the Earth's equatorial plane. The angle between the Earth's equatorial plane and the ecliptic, ε, is called the obliquity of the ecliptic and ε ≈ 23.4°.

An equinox occurs when the earth is at a position in its orbit such that a vector from the earth toward the sun points to where the ecliptic intersects the celestial equator. The equinox which occurs near the first day of spring (with respect to the North hemisphere) is called the vernal equinox. The vernal equinox can be used as a principal direction for ECI frames. The Sun lies in the direction of the vernal equinox around 21 March. The fundamental plane for ECI frames is usually either the equatorial plane or the ecliptic.

The location of an object in space can be defined in terms of right ascension and declination which are measured from the vernal equinox and the celestial equator. Right ascension and declination are spherical coordinates analogous to longitude and latitude, respectively. Locations of objects in space can also be represented using Cartesian coordinates in an ECI frame.

The gravitational attraction of the Sun and Moon on the Earth's equatorial bulge cause the rotational axis of the Earth to precess in space similar to the action of a top. This is called precession. Nutation is the smaller amplitude shorter-period (< 18.6 years) wobble that is superposed on the precessional motion of the Celestial pole. It is due to shorter-period fluctuations in the strength of the torque exerted on Earth's equatorial bulge by the sun, moon, and planets. When the short-term periodic oscillations of this motion are averaged out, they are considered "mean" as opposed to "true" values. Thus, the vernal equinox, the equatorial plane of the Earth, and the ecliptic plane vary according to date and are specified for a particular epoch. Models representing the ever-changing orientation of the Earth in space are available from the International Earth Rotation and Reference Systems Service.

Examples include:

- J2000: One commonly used ECI frame is defined with the Earth's Mean Equator and Mean Equinox (MEME) at 12:00 Terrestrial Time on 1 January 2000. It can be referred to as J2K, J2000 or EME2000. The x-axis is aligned with the mean vernal equinox. The z-axis is aligned with the Earth's rotation axis (or equivalently, the celestial North Pole) as it was at that time. The y-axis is rotated by 90° East about the celestial equator.
- M50: This frame is similar to J2000, but is defined with the mean equator and equinox at the beginning of the Besselian year 1950, which is B1950.0 = JDE 2433282.423357 = 1950 January 0.9235 TT = 1949 December 31 22:09:50.4 TT.
- GCRF: Geocentric Celestial Reference Frame is the Earth-centered counterpart of the International Celestial Reference Frame.
- MOD: a Mean of Date (MOD) frame is defined using the mean equator and equinox on a particular date.
- TEME: the ECI frame used for the NORAD two-line elements is sometimes called true equator, mean equinox (TEME) although it does not use the conventional mean equinox.
An example of Earth-centered frame

Earth-centered inertial – Polar view

Earth-centered, Earth fixed – Polar view

Earth · IRNSS-1B · IRNSS-1C · IRNSS-1E · IRNSS-1F · IRNSS-1G · IRNSS-1I

== See also ==
- Earth's axial tilt
- Geocentric Celestial Reference System
- Orbital state vectors
