= INSAT Satellite bus =

Series of Indian satellite buses

The INSAT Satellite Bus is a series of satellite buses that have been manufactured by the Indian Space Research Organisation and marketed by NewSpace India Limited. It consist of five different versions; I-1K, I-2K, I-3K, I-4K& I-6K.

== I-1K ==
I-1K (also referred to as INSAT-1000) is a satellite bus developed by the Indian Space Research Organisation (ISRO) and marketed by Antrix Corporation. The I-1K bus is designed to be compatible with lightweight geostationary satellites and is commonly used for meteorological satellites.The IRS or Indian Remote Sensing Satellite bus are also built on I-1K. ISRO also developed monopropellant thrusters, and later bi-propellant Liquid Apogee Motors for the INSAT communication satellites.

=== Design ===
- The I-1K bus can be used for satellites in the lightweight category, with a launch mass between 1,050 and 1,100 kilograms (2,310 and 2,430 lb).
- Its dimensions are 1.505 m × 1.476 m × 1.530 m (4.94 ft × 4.84 ft × 5.02 ft).
- I-1K's dry mass is 500 kg (1,100 lb) and can support payloads of 100 kg (220 lb).
- Its power systems can supply between 500 and 1000 watts.
- The average transponder life is 7 years which can be extended up to 12 years.

=== List of satellites launched using I-1K platform ===
- Kalpana-1
- GSAT-12
- IRNSS series (1A | 1B | 1C | 1D | 1E | 1F | 1G | 1H | 1I)
- Chandrayaan-1
- Mars Orbiter Mission
- Aditya-L1 Mission

== I-2K ==
I-2K is a satellite bus developed by Indian Space Research Organisation (ISRO), and marketed by Antrix Corporation. It is a standard bus for 2,000 kg class satellites; the 'I' in I-2K stands for INSAT, a group of communication satellites developed and launched by ISRO. The satellite buses developed by ISRO are specifically developed for small and medium weight satellites. I-2K spacecraft bus can supply DC power up to 3000 watts. I-2K platform is targeted towards satellites in liftoff mass in range of 1500–2500 kg.

=== Features of I-2K ===
- Launch Mass: 2,000–2,300 kg (4,400–5,100 lb).
- Dimensions: 1.65 * 1.53m in plan & 3.0m in height.
- Dry Mass: 600–950 kg (1,320–2,090 lb).
- Payload Mass: 160–200 kg (350–440 lb).
- Total Power: 2800 W.
- Payload Power: 2400 W.
- Transponder: 12 - 18.
- Mission Life: 12 - 15 Years.

=== List of satellites launched using I-2K platform ===
- INSAT series (3B | 3C | 3D | 3DR | 3E | 4C | 4CR)
- IRS series (1C | 1D | P3)
- GSAT series (1 | 2 | 3 (EDUSAT) | 4 | 5P | 6 | 6A | 7 | 7A | 9 | 14 | 31)
- HYLAS-1

== I-3K ==
I-3K or the INSAT 3000 is a satellite bus developed by Indian Space Research Organisation (ISRO), and marketed by Antrix Corporation and New Space India Ltd. It is the standard bus for 3,000-kg class satellites; the 'I' in I-3K stands for INSAT, a group of communication satellites developed and launched by ISRO. The I-3K bus can supply DC power up to 6500 watts, and is suitable for satellites with lift-off mass in range of 3,000-3,400 kg.

=== List of satellites launched using I-3K bus ===
- Eutelsat W2M (Now Afghansat 1)
- INSAT series (4A | 4B)
- GSAT series (8 | 10 | 16 | 15 | 18 | 19 | 17 | 24 | 29 | 30)
- Chandrayaan-3 (Propulsion module)
- NISAR

== I-4K ==
I-4K is a satellite bus being developed by the Indian Space Research Organisation (ISRO). It will be a standard bus for 4,000–6,500 kg (8,800–14,300 lb) class communication satellites. The I in I-4K stands for INSAT, a group of communication satellites developed and launched by ISRO. The I-4K spacecraft bus can supply DC power of 10 to 15 kilowatts.

=== List of satellites being developed with I-4K bus ===
- GSAT series

== I-6K ==
I-6K is a Satellite bus developed by Indian Space Research Organisation (ISRO) It will be a standard bus for 4,000–6,500 kg (8,800–14,300 lb) class communication satellites; the I in I-6K stands for INSAT and 6 signifies that it can support satellites up to 6,000 kg in weight. The I-6K spacecraft bus can supply DC power of 10 to 15 kilowatts.

== See also ==
- Comparison of satellite buses
- Indian Mini Satellite Bus
