= ISSDC =

ISSDC may refer to:

- Indian Space Science Data Centre
- International Shiloh Shepherd Dog Club, an organization.
- International Space Settlement Design Competition, a previously NASA sponsored competition and ongoing program.
