= IRNSS-1H =

Indian navigation satellite

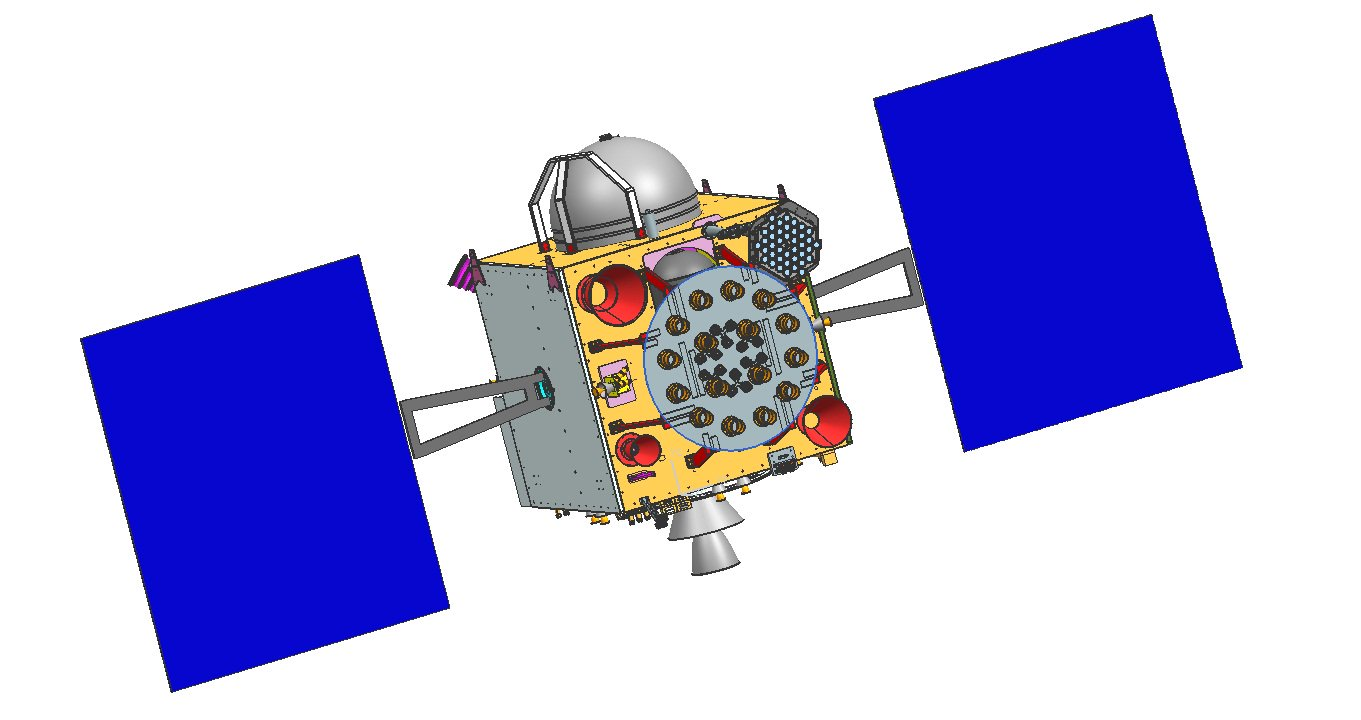
- Typical IRNSS series one spacecraft
- Mission type: Navigation
- Operator: ISRO
- COSPAR ID: 2017-051A
- SATCAT no.: 42928
- Website: https://www.ursc.gov.in/navigation/html/irnss-1h.jsp
- Mission duration: Planned: 10 years

Spacecraft properties
- Bus: I-1K
- Manufacturer: ISRO Satellite Centre; Space Applications Centre; Alpha Design et al.
- Launch mass: 1,425 kilograms (3,142 lb)
- Dry mass: 594.35 kilograms (1,310.3 lb)
- Power: 1671 watts

Start of mission
- Launch date: 31 August 2017, 13:30 UTC
- Rocket: PSLV-XL C39
- Launch site: Satish Dhawan SLP
- Contractor: ISRO

End of mission
- Disposal: Launch vehicle heatshield failure
- Decay date: 2 March 2019

Orbital parameters
- Reference system: Geocentric

IRNSS-1H was the eighth in the Indian Regional Navigational Satellite System (IRNSS) series of satellites, after IRNSS-1A, IRNSS-1B, IRNSS-1C, IRNSS-1D, IRNSS-1E, IRNSS-1F and IRNSS-1G. It was lost in the launch failure of PSLV-C39 on August 31, 2017.

== Overview ==
IRNSS-1H was India's first satellite to be assembled, integrated and tested by private firms under ISRO supervision and was intended to replace the failed IRNSS-1A and complete the NAVIC constellation of geosynchronous navigation satellites which is a ₹1420-crore independent regional navigation satellite system developed by India.

Payload:

- Navigation payload in S band and L5 band, dual Helix Array Antenna (1.1 m diameter)
- CDMA ranging payload in C band
- Rubidium Atomic Frequency Standard
- Corner Cube Retro Reflector for Laser Ranging

Propulsion: Conventional bipropellant system with Mono Methyl Hydrazine as fuel and Mixed Oxides of Nitrogen (MON-3) as oxidizer.

- Twelve 22N thrusters.
- One 440N Liquid Apogee Motor (LAM)
- Two 390 litres (86 imp gal; 100 US gal) propellant tanks
- One 67 litres (15 imp gal; 18 US gal) pressurant tank with CFRP overwrap and Titanium liner.

== Launch ==
PSLV-C39 carrying IRNSS-1H was using XL variant of Polar Satellite Launch Vehicle on its forty-first flight. Launch occurred as scheduled at 19:00 IST or 13:30 UTC, 31 August 2017 from Second Launch Pad of SDSC (SHAR) aiming for orbit of 284 by 20,650 kilometres (176 mi × 12,831 mi) (Sub GTO) with 19.2° inclination. Vehicle performed initial flight sequences as planned but 203 seconds into flight, the payload fairing jettison event was not accomplished. Excluding this mid-flight malfunction, rest of the planned flight sequences including spacecraft separation at 17 minutes and 56 seconds occurred nominally but due to extra 1,182 kilograms (2,606 lb) mass of fairing, target orbit could not be achieved leaving the combined assembly of PSLV upper-stage (PS4), enclosed payload fairing and trapped IRNSS-1H spacecraft in 167.4 by 6,554.8 kilometres (104.0 mi × 4,073.0 mi) orbit with 19.18° inclination. Liquid Apogee Motor (LAM) of IRNSS-1H was fired to help it come out of the payload fairing and to consume the propellants and passivate the spacecraft.

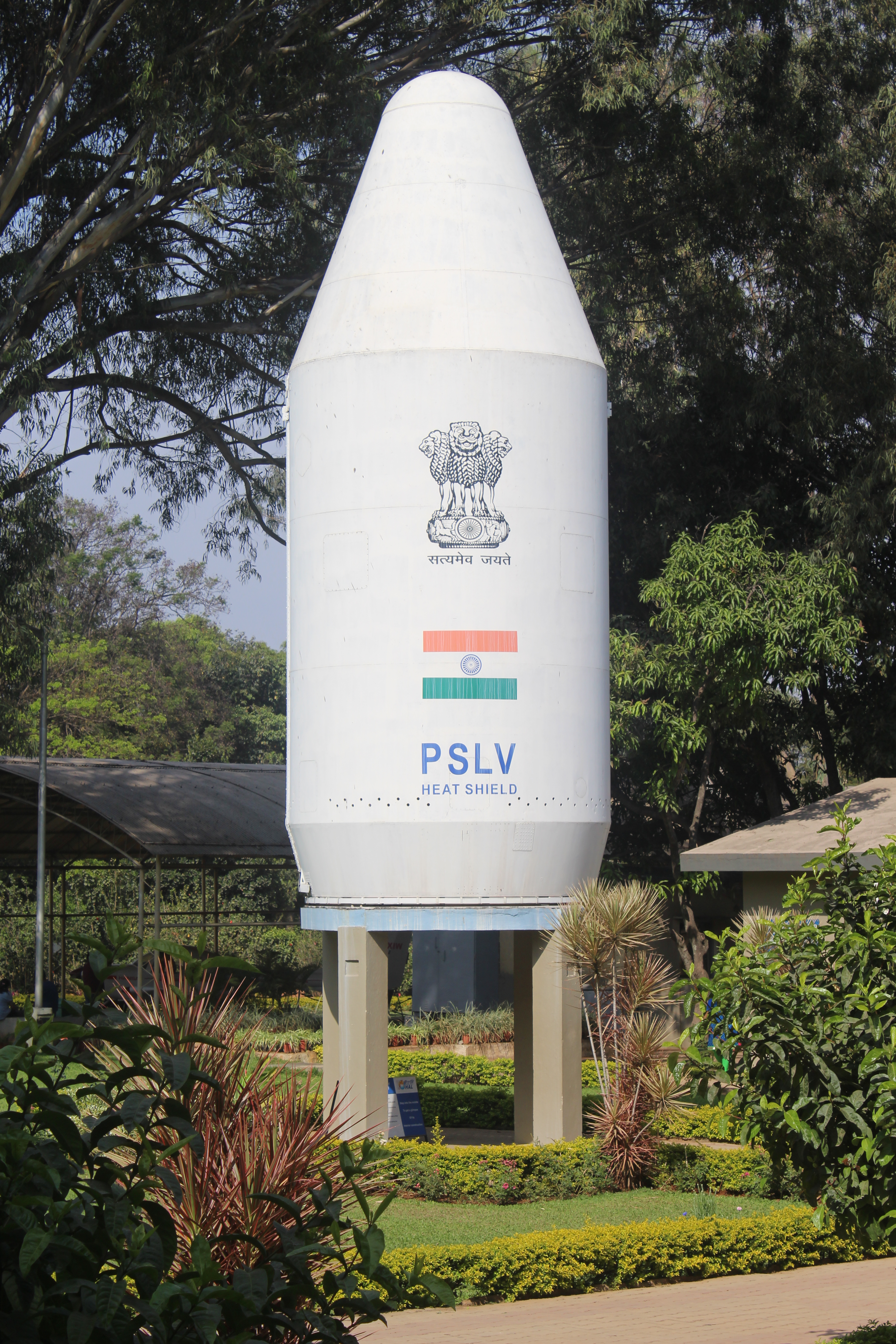
PSLV payload fairing or heatshield

Prior to PSLV C39 / IRNSS-1H, last launch failure involving a PSLV happened 24 years ago in 1993, following which many variants of PSLV rockets have had 39 successful launches.

== Cause of failure ==
PSLV-C39 payload fairing separation mechanism consisted of horizontal and vertical jettisoning system which separates the clamshell fairing into two halves upon jettisoning. At the scheduled time during flight separation command was issued and the horizontal jettisoning system functioned nominally but the vertical jettisoning system malfunctioned and subsequently two halves of the payload fairing could not move apart. The cause of malfunction was identified as non-initiation of detonation in pyro device of vertical jettisoning system.

== Orbit decay ==
Combined assembly of PSLV fourth stage, payload fairings and enclosed IRNSS-1H spacecraft within it weighed between 2,675 and 3,480 kilograms (5,897 and 7,672 lb) and re-entered Earth's atmosphere around 19:23 UTC on 2 March 2019 over Vanuatu.

== See also ==
- GPS-aided geo-augmented navigation (GAGAN)
- Satellite navigation
