= NavIC =

Indian satellite navigation system

Navigation with Indian Constellation (NavIC)
- Logo of NavIC
- Country/ies of origin: India
- Operator: ISRO
- Type: Military; Commercial
- Status: Operational
- Coverage: Regional (up to 1,500 km or 930 mi from borders)
- Accuracy: 3 m or 9.8 ft (public); 2 m or 6 ft 7 in (encrypted)

Constellation size
- Nominal satellites: 7
- Current usable satellites: List: IRNSS- 1B/1I (Operational) 1A/1C/1D/1E/1F/1G/1H (Clock failure, short-message services only, launch failure); NVS- 01/03 (Operational) 02 (Failed to reach orbit)
- First launch: 1 July 2013; 13 years ago
- Last launch: 30th October, 2026
- Total launches: 12

Orbital characteristics
- Regime(s): geostationary orbit (GEO), inclined geosynchronous orbit (IGSO)
- Orbital height: 35,786 km (22,236 mi)

Other details
- Cost: ₹2,246 crore (US$240 million) as of March 2017

The Navigation with Indian Constellation or NavIC (also, nāvik 'sailor' or 'navigator' in Indian languages, formerly known as the Indian Regional Navigation Satellite System or IRNSS) is an autonomous regional satellite navigation system that provides accurate real-time positioning, navigation and timing (PNT) services. It covers India and a region extending 1,500 km (930 mi) around it, with plans for further extension up to 3,000 km (1,900 mi) with 10–20 m (33–66 ft) position accuracy and 40ns time accuracy. An extended service area lies between the primary service area and a rectangle area enclosed by the 30th parallel south to the 50th parallel north and the 30th meridian east to the 130th meridian east, 1,500–6,000 km (930–3,730 mi) beyond borders where some of the NavIC satellites are visible but the position is not always computable with assured accuracy.

== Background ==
The system was developed partly because access to foreign global navigation satellite systems is not guaranteed in hostile situations, as happened to the Indian military in 1999 when the United States denied an Indian request for Global Positioning System (GPS) data for the Kargil region, which would have provided vital information, forcing Indian Air Force pilots to mount commercial GPS devices in their cockpits to drop unguided or semi-guided payloads. The Indian government approved the project in May 2006.

The NavIC offers two levels of service, standard positioning service (SPS), which will be open for civilian use and is interoperable with GNSS, and a restricted service (RS), an encrypted channel for authorized users including the military, in L1 (1575.42 MHz, in use since the second generation), L5 (1176.45 MHz) and S Band (2498.028 MHz).

The first generation (IRNSS series) of the satellite network was designed for 7 satellites with three atomic clocks each, including IRNSS-1A, IRNSS-1B, IRNSS-1C, IRNSS-1D, IRNSS-1E, IRNSS-1F and IRNSS-1G serving as initial set of satellites, and replacement satellites, IRNSS-1H failing to reach orbit, followed by the successful launch of IRNSS-1I. Each of the IRNSS satellites has an active and two reserved atomic clocks. However, multiple failure of on-board atomic clocks across satellites prompted ISRO to adopt indigenous atomic clocks, developed by the Space Application Centre, Ahmedabad, for its second generation of NVS satellites. The NVS series, including NVS-01, NVS-02, NVS-03, NVS-04 and NVS-05, would employ a mix of imported and indigenous atomic clocks as well as an increased operational lifetime from 10 to 12 years.

However, as of March 2026, only three satellites were capable of providing real-time positioning, navigation and timing (PNT) service — IRNSS-1B, IRNSS-1I and NVS-01 — due to the failure of atomic clocks of IRNSS satellites, failure of NVS-02 to reach orbit and launch delay of the second generation satellites. This is below the minimum number of four satellites required for an accurate position. Meanwhile, five satellites — IRNSS-1A, IRNSS-1C, IRNSS-1E, IRNSS-1F and IRNSS-1G — are being used for one-way broadcast messaging service after their on-board atomic clocks failed. IRNSS-1D has been decommissioned while two other satellites, IRNSS-1H and NVS-02, failed to reach desired orbit. ISRO is planning to launch NVS-03, NVS-04 and NVS-05 by September 2027.

NavIC-based trackers are compulsory on commercial vehicles in India, and some consumer mobile phones with support for it have been available since the first half of 2020.

== Components ==
=== IRNSS series (First generation) ===
As part of the project, the Indian Space Research Organisation (ISRO) opened a new satellite navigation centre within the campus of ISRO Deep Space Network (DSN) at Byalalu, Karnataka on 28 May 2013. A network of 21 ranging stations located across the country will provide data for the orbital determination of the satellites and monitoring of the navigation signal.

A goal of complete Indian control has been stated, with the space segment, ground segment and user receivers all being built in India. Its location in low latitudes facilitates coverage with low-inclination satellites. Three satellites will be in geostationary orbit over the Indian Ocean. Missile targeting could be an important military application for the constellation.

The total cost of the project was expected to be ₹1,420 crore (US$313.42 million), with the cost of the ground segment being ₹300 crore (US$32 million), each satellite costing ₹150 crore (US$16 million) and the PSLV-XL version rocket costing around ₹130 crore (US$14 million). The planned seven rockets would have involved an outlay of around ₹910 crore (US$97 million).

The necessity for two replacement satellites, and PSLV-XL launches, has altered the original budget, with the Comptroller and Auditor General of India reporting costs (as of March 2017) of ₹2,246 crore (US$240 million).

India's Department of Space in their 12th Five Year Plan (FYP) (2012–17) stated increasing the number of satellites in the constellation from 7 to 11 to extend coverage. These additional four satellites will be made during 12th FYP and will be launched in the beginning of 13th FYP (2018–23) in geosynchronous orbit of 42° inclination. Also, the development of space-qualified Indian made atomic clocks was initiated, along with a study and development initiative for an all optical atomic clock (ultra stable for IRNSS and deep space communication).

The NavIC Signal in Space ICD was released for evaluation in September 2014.

From 1 April 2019, use of AIS 140 compliant NavIC-based vehicle tracking systems were made compulsory for all commercial vehicles in India.

In December 2019, the United States Congress consented to designate NaVIC as one of their allied navigational satellite systems along with Galileo (Europe) and QZSS (Japan). The approval was as a part of National Defense Authorization Act 2020. The proposal was put forward by United States Secretary of Defense in consultation with Director of National Intelligence.

=== Indian atomic clock ===
Research works on an indigenous atomic clocks was underway as early as in June 2013 since it was an important component in the working of the navigation constellation and had to be imported.

In May 2015, A. S. Kiran Kumar, the then ISRO chairman announced that the agency was developing a Rubidium atomic clocks indigenously to potentially replace the European counterparts in future navigational satellites which will replace the in-service IRNSS-1 series spacecrafts following their 10-year lifespan. The prototypes were being developed by ISRO's Space Applications Centre (SAC) in Ahmedabad and CSIR’s National Physical Laboratory in New Delhi. Further qualified and flight-worthy versions would be developed. The clocks are required to be compact and fuel efficient in space.

On 5 July 2017, ISRO and Israel Space Agency (ISA) signed an Memorandum of Understanding to collaborate on space qualifying a Rubidium Standard based on AccuBeat model AR133A and to test it on an ISRO satellite. In May 2018, Tapan Misra, the then SAC director, announced that the indigenous clocks were undergoing qualification trials following which it would be used in an experimental navigational satellite for further accuracy and durability trials.

The clocks have been designated as the Indian Rubidium Atomic Frequency Standard (IRAFS). The NVS series satellites carry one of these clocks along with three Israeli counterparts. Further, the imported clocks could be entirely replaced by IRAFS from NVS-05 onwards subject to the performance of the indigenous clocks flown out in earlier NVS satellites as told by V. Narayanan, the ISRO chairman, in 2025. As part of the Times Dissemination Project, which is overseen by the Ministry of Consumer Affairs, Food, and Public Distribution, NavIC will take the position of GPS as the reference time provider at the National Physical Laboratory of India from 2025.

In 2025, the development was also being delayed since multiple components were being imported leading to procurement challenges. Later satellites were proposed to be equipped with five atomic clocks each.

=== Microprocessor ===
The SPARC V8 ISA compatible AJIT microprocessor for robotics and industrial applications was created in 2018 by IIT Bombay. The Ministry of Electronics and Information Technology, IIT Bombay, and Powai Labs, a private firm from Mumbai, provided funding for the project. Initially produced by Semi-Conductor Laboratory utilizing 180nm process, commercial production using 65nm and 45nm are planned. AJIT operates at clock speeds between 70 and 120 MHz and can execute one instruction every clock cycle.

It includes a memory management unit that stores and retrieves data from memory, as well as an arithmetic logic unit that performs simple arithmetic and logical operations. Additionally, there is a floating point unit that can effectively manage computations involving non-integer quantities. A hardware debugger unit is used to monitor and control the microprocessor in order to program it. The Society for Applied Microwave Electronics Engineering & Research will incorporate AJIT in the receivers being developed for NavIC.

=== NavIC chip ===
In accordance with the range requirements for NavIC for both military and commercial applications, Defence Research and Development Organisation, through the Technology Development Fund scheme, has commissioned Accord Software and Systems, to build a tailored and flexible IRNSS Network Timing system domestically. Using NavIC data, the receiver chip will obtain and distribute Indian time for navigation. India currently depends on the US for this service.

In 2020, Qualcomm launched four Snapdragon 4G chipsets and one 5G chipset with support for NavIC. NavIC is planned to be available for civilian use in mobile devices, after Qualcomm and ISRO signed an agreement. To increase compatibility with existing hardware, ISRO will add L1 band support. For strategic application, Long Code support is also coming.

On 7 December 2023, Qualcomm revealed that select chipset platforms will enable NavIC L1 signals. The Qualcomm location suite, supports up to seven satellite constellations simultaneously and allows for faster Time to First Fix (TTFF) position acquisition for enhanced location-based services. It also makes use of all of NavIC's L1 and L5 signals for precise positioning. In the second half of 2024, Qualcomm chipset platforms will add further support for the NavIC L1 signals, and in the first half of 2025, commercial products that support the NavIC L1 signals should be available for sale.

== Timeline ==
=== Launch of IRNSS satellites (2006–2016) ===
In May 2006, the Government of India approved the establishment of the Indian Regional Navigational Satellite System (IRNSS) with a constellation of seven satellites launched by Indian space launch vehicles wihtin a span of 6 or 7 years. The budget of ₹1,420 crore (US$313.42 million) was allotted in June 2006. In September 2008, SpectraTime announced that they had received a contract worth €4 million to supply Rubidium atomic clocks to ISRO for the IRNSS programme. The first satellite launch was expected in 2009.

In April 2010, it was reported that India plans to start launching satellites by the end of 2011, at a rate of one satellite every six months. This would have made NavIC functional by 2015. But the program was delayed, and India also launched 3 new satellites to supplement this.

Seven satellites with the prefix "IRNSS-1" will constitute the space segment of the IRNSS. IRNSS-1A, the first of the seven satellites, was launched on 1 July 2013. IRNSS-1B was launched on 4 April 2014 on-board PSLV-C24 rocket. The satellite has been placed in geosynchronous orbit. IRNSS-1C was launched on 16 October 2014, IRNSS-1D on 28 March 2015, IRNSS-1E on 20 January 2016, IRNSS-1F on 10 March 2016 and IRNSS-1G was launched on 28 April 2016.

=== Clock failures and replacements (2017–present) ===
In January 2017, it was reported that all three rubidium atomic clocks on board IRNSS-1A had failed within a span of six months. The satellite was not being used for computations without the clocks but was partially operational for messaging services. ISRO was expected to launch one of the standby satellite for replacement in the latter half of the year. Similar failures occurred on Galileo constellation. ISRO reported it had replaced the atomic clocks in the two standby satellites, IRNSS-1H and IRNSS-1I in June 2017. The subsequent launch of IRNSS-1H, as a replacement for IRNSS-1A, was unsuccessful when PSLV-C39 mission failed on 31 August 2017. The second standby satellite, IRNSS-1I, was successfully placed into orbit on 12 April 2018.

The eighth satellite, IRNSS-1H, which was meant to replace IRNSS-1A, failed to deploy on 31 August 2017 as the heat shields failed to separate from the 4th stage of the rocket. IRNSS-1I was launched on 12 April 2018 to replace it.

In July 2017, it was reported that two more clocks in the navigational system had also started showing signs of abnormality, thereby taking the total number of failed clocks to five, in May 2018 a failure of a further 4 clocks was reported, taking the count to 9 of the 24 in orbit.

As a precaution to extend the operational life of navigation satellite, ISRO is running only one rubidium atomic clock instead of two in the remaining satellites. By May 2018, nine of the 21 atomic clocks sourced from Astrium onboard the seven satellites were offline.

As of May 2023 only four first generation satellites were capable of providing navigation services which is the minimum number required for service to remain operational.

As of September 2024 only four satellites IRNSS-1B, IRNSS-1F, IRNSS-1I and NVS-01 were capable of providing navigation services.

In July 2025, while responding to a query through Right to Information Act, the ISRO revealed that five IRNSS satellites are completely defunct, with all of their three clocks having failed. Additionally, one satellite has only one functional clock and only two satellites are fully functional.

On 10 March 2026, with IRNSS-1F clock failure marking completion of its 10 year mission life reduced the satellite network to only three operational satellites sending position data, below minimum number of satellites needed for accurate position data. It will be a part of five satellites out of the eight remaining functional satellites, being used to provide one way broadcast messaging services from thereon. India had launched a total of eleven NavIC satellites at that point.

=== Launch of NVS satellites (2023–present) ===
In its annual report for 2018–19, ISRO announced its plans to realise five replacement or follow-on satellites (IRNSS-1J to -1N) to be placed in the existing orbital slots in order to ensure continuous NavIC service. ISRO's 2020–21 annual report stated that the L1 band signal for civil applications will be introduced in the upcoming NavIC satellites, renamed as NVS-01 to -05, alongside the existing L5 and S bands, and that they were being designed with a targeted lisfespan of 12 years.

In March 2021, The Times of India reported that ISRO would launch the NVS-01 navigation satellite the same year. In November 2022, The New Indian Express announced that ISRO has received approvals to develop five additional NavIC satellites whereas S. Somanath, the then ISRO chairman, confirmed that each of the satellites would carry four atomic clocks including one Indian Rubidium Atomic Frequency Standard (IRAFS).

NVS-01, first of the second generation satellites, was successfully launched on 29 May 2023 and was placed into orbit as a replacement for IRNSS-1G. The launch of NVS-02 in on 29 January 2025 was a partial success since the satellite failed to reach the intended orbit despite the success of the launch vehicle because of a fuel system failure on the satellite. Hence, the satellite is not considered as operational. As of March 2025, ISRO has sought approval for three additional spacecraft under the NVS series. Latter satellites are proposed to be equipped with five atomic clocks each to reduce the risks of losing satellites due to clock failures according to an August 2025 report. Further, V. Narayanan, the ISRO chairman, indicated that the imported clocks could be entirely replaced by IRAFS from NVS-05 onwards subject to the performance of the indigenous clocks flown out in earlier NVS satellites.

During March 2026, ISRO announced its plans to launch NVS-03, -04 and -05 by September 2027 with intervals of six months. The original plan was to launch the satellites between 2025 and 2026. Thereafter NVS-03 was launched on 30 October 2026 and was placed into its intended orbit on 4 November. The successful launch revived the navigation service of the constellation with its minimum operational configuration with four operational satellites. Of the four, IRNSS-1B being the oldest satellite has been operational beyond its 10-year technical lifespan while -1I is expected to function until 2028. Further, NVS-04 and NVS-05 were also under "advanced stages of realisation". The cryogenic engine for GSLV F19 to launch NVS-04 was identified in November 2026.

== System description ==
The IRNSS system comprises a space segment and a support ground segment.

=== Space segment ===
The constellation consists of 7 satellitesincluding three in geostationary orbits (GEO) and four in inclined geosynchronous orbits (IGSO) at an altitude of approximately 36,000 km (22,000 mi). The GEO satellites are located at longitudes 32.5° E, 83° E, and 131.5° E. Meanwhile, the four IGSO satellites cross the equator at 55° E and 111.75° E, with two satellites in each orbital plane, with an inclination of 29°.

=== Ground segment ===
The ground segment is responsible for the maintenance and operation of the IRNSS constellation. The ground segment comprises:

- IRNSS Spacecraft Control Facility (IRSCF)
- ISRO Navigation Centre (INC)
- IRNSS Range and Integrity Monitoring Stations (IRIMS)
- IRNSS Network Timing Centre (IRNWT)
- IRNSS CDMA Ranging Stations (IRCDR)
- Laser Ranging Stations
- IRNSS Data Communication Network (IRDCN)

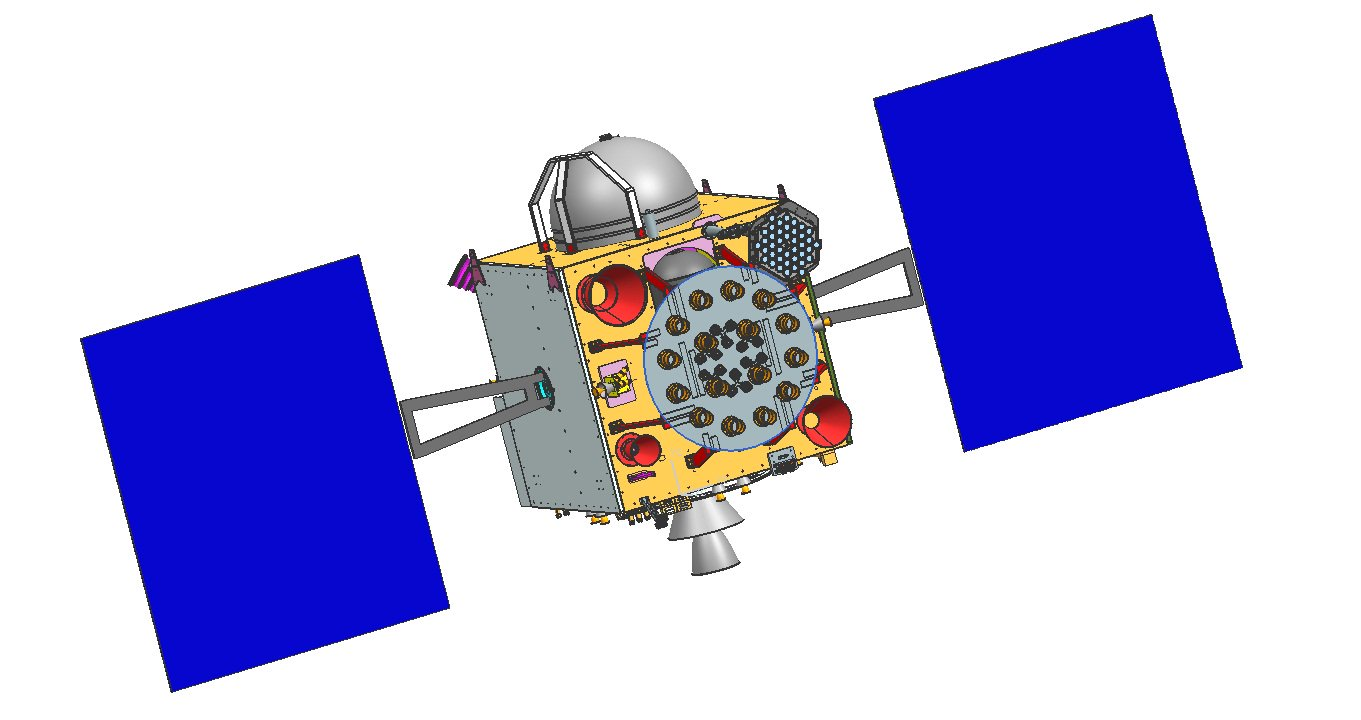
Rendering of an IRNSS Series 1 satellite

The IRSCF is operational at Master Control Facility (MCF), Hassan and Bhopal. The MCF uplinks navigation data and is used for tracking, telemetry and command functions. Seven 7.2-metre (24 ft) FCA and two 11-metre (36 ft) FMA of IRSCF are currently operational for LEOP and on-orbit phases of IRNSS satellites.

The INC established at Byalalu performs remote operations and data collection with all the ground stations. The ISRO Navigation Centres (INC) are operational at Byalalu, Bengaluru and Lucknow. INC1 (Byalalu) and INC2 (Lucknow) together provide operations with redundancy.

16 IRIMS are currently operational and are supporting IRNSS operations. A few more are planned in Brunei, Indonesia, Australia, Russia, France and Japan. CDMA ranging is being carried out by the four IRCDR stations on a regular basis for all the IRNSS satellites. The IRNWT has been established and is providing IRNSS system time with an accuracy of 2 ns (2.0×10^{−9} s) (2 sigma) with respect to UTC. Laser ranging is being carried out with the support of ILRS stations around the world. Navigation software is operational at INC since 1 Aug 2013. All the navigation parameters, such as satellite ephemeris, clock corrections, integrity parameters, and secondary parameters, such as iono-delay corrections, time offsets with respect to UTC and other GNSS, almanac, text message, and earth orientation parameters, are generated and uploaded to the spacecraft automatically. The IRDCN has established terrestrial and VSAT links between the ground stations. As of March 2021, ISRO and JAXA are performing calibration and validation experiments for NavIC ground reference station in Japan. ISRO is also under discussion with CNES for a NavIC ground reference station in France. ISRO is planning a NavIC ground station at Cocos (Keeling) Islands and is in talks with the Australian Space Agency.

=== Signal ===
The NavIC provides a Standard Positioning Service for general use and a Restricted Service for military and government operations. The satellites transmit microwave signals in L5 (1176.45 MHz) and S band (2492.028 MHz). The L1 band (1575.42 MHz) has been added in the NVS series satellites to serve the wearable devices market in India since they require small form factor and very low power. The SPS signal will be modulated by a 1 MHz BPSK signal. The Restricted Service will use BOC(5,2). The navigation signals themselves would be transmitted in the L5 (1176.45 MHz) & S band (2492.028 MHz) frequencies and broadcast through a phased array antenna to maintain required coverage and signal strength. The satellites would weigh approximately 1,330 kg (2,930 lb) and their solar panels generate 1,400 W.

A messaging interface is embedded in the NavIC system. This feature allows the command center to send warnings to a specific geographic area. For example, fishermen using the system can be warned about a cyclone.

=== Accuracy ===
The Standard Positioning Service system is intended to provide an absolute position accuracy of about 5–10 metres (16–33 ft) throughout the Indian landmass and an accuracy of about 20 metres (66 ft) in the Indian Ocean as well as a region extending approximately 1,500 km (930 mi) around India. GPS, for comparison, has a position accuracy of 5 m under ideal conditions. However, unlike GPS, which is dependent only on L-band, NavIC has dual frequencies (S and L bands). When a low-frequency signal travels through atmosphere, its velocity changes due to atmospheric disturbances. GPS depends on an atmospheric model to assess frequency error, and it has to update this model from time to time to assess the exact error. In NavIC, the actual delay is assessed by measuring the difference in delay of the two frequencies (S and L bands). Therefore, NavIC is not dependent on any model to find the frequency error and can be more accurate than GPS.

== Future developments ==
=== NVS series (Second generation) ===
The NVS series is the second generation of NavIC satellites. The project to realise five replacement or follow-on satellites (IRNSS-1J to -1N) to be placed in the existing orbital slots was first noted in the 2018–19 ISRO annual report. The satellite designations were changed to NVS-01 to -05, respectively by 2020–21. A budget of ₹964.68 crore (equivalent to ₹11 billion or US$120 million in 2026) excluding the launch costs had been allotted for the project. By March 2025, ISRO has sought approval for three additional spacecraft under the series.

The satellites feature L1 band signal for civil applications alongside the existing L5 and S bands. The L1 single frequency modules are meant to serve the wearable devices market in India since they require small form factor and very low power. The new generation satellites have a targeted lisfespan of 12 years. The NVS series also carries four atomic clocks including one Indian Rubidium Atomic Frequency Standard (IRAFS) developed by the Space Applications Centre (SAC). Latter satellites are proposed to be equipped with five atomic clocks each to reduce the risks of losing satellites due to clock failures according to an August 2025 report. Further, V. Narayanan, the ISRO chairman, indicated that the imported clocks could be entirely replaced by IRAFS from NVS-05 onwards subject to the performance of the indigenous clocks flown out in earlier NVS satellites.

NVS-01 to -03 has been launched between 2023 and 2026 while NVS-02 was a partial success due to a fuel system failure on the satellite. Further, the NVS-04 and -05 are expected to be launched by September 2027 with a six-month intervals between each satellite.

=== Global Indian Navigation System ===
Study and analysis for the Global Indian Navigation System (GINS) was initiated as part of the technology and policy initiatives in the 12th FYP (2012–17). The system is supposed to have a constellation of 24 satellites, positioned 24,000 km (14,913 mi) above Earth. As of 2013, the statutory filing for frequency spectrum of GINS satellite orbits in international space, has been completed. As per new 2021 draft policy, ISRO and Department of Space (DoS) is working on expanding the coverage of NavIC from regional to global that will be independent of other such system currently operational namely GPS, GLONASS, BeiDou and Galileo while remaining interoperable and free for global public use. ISRO has proposed to Government of India to expand the constellation for global coverage by initially placing twelve satellites in Medium Earth Orbit (MEO).

== List of satellites ==
The constellation consists of 7 active satellites. Three of the seven satellites in constellation are located in geostationary orbit (GEO) and four are in inclined geosynchronous orbit (IGSO). All satellites launched or proposed for the system are as follows:

=== IRNSS series satellites ===
IRNSS-1 series satellites
Satellite	SVN	PRN	Int. Sat. ID	NORAD ID	Launch Date	Launch Vehicle	Orbit	Status	Remarks
IRNSS-1A	I001	I01	2013-034A	39199	1 July 2013	PSLV-C22	Geosynchronous (IGSO) / 55°E, 29° inclined orbit	Partial Failure	Atomic clocks failed. The satellite is being used for NavIC's short message broadcast service.
IRNSS-1B	I002	I02	2014-017A	39635	4 April 2014	PSLV-C24	Geosynchronous (IGSO) / 55°E, 29° inclined orbit	Operational	
IRNSS-1C	I003	I03	2014-061A	40269	16 October 2014	PSLV-C26	Geostationary (GEO) / 83°E, 5° inclined orbit	Partial Failure	Atomic clocks failed. The satellite is being used for NavIC's short message broadcast service.
IRNSS-1D	I004	I04	2015-018A	40547	28 March 2015	PSLV-C27	Geosynchronous (IGSO) / 111.75°E, 31° inclined orbit	Decommissioned	Satellite has been decommissioned.
IRNSS-1E	I005	I05	2016-003A	41241	20 January 2016	PSLV-C31	Geosynchronous (IGSO) / 111.75°E, 29° inclined orbit	Partial Failure	Atomic clocks failed. The satellite is being used for NavIC's short message broadcast service.
IRNSS-1F	I006	I06	2016-015A	41384	10 March 2016	PSLV-C32	Geostationary (GEO) / 32.5°E, 5° inclined orbit	Partial Failure	Atomic clocks failed. The satellite is being used for NavIC's short message broadcast service.
IRNSS-1G	I007	I07	2016-027A	41469	28 April 2016	PSLV-C33	Geostationary (GEO) / 129.5°E, 5.1° inclined orbit	Partial Failure	Replaced by NVS-01. Currently being used for NavIC's short message broadcast service.
IRNSS-1H	I008	I08			31 August 2017	PSLV-C39	Geosynchronous (IGSO) / 55°E, 29° inclined orbit	Launch Failed	The payload fairing failed to separate and satellite could not reach the desired orbit. It was meant to replace defunct IRNSS-1A.
IRNSS-1I	I009	I09	2018-035A	43286	12 April 2018	PSLV-C41	Geosynchronous (IGSO) / 55°E, 29° inclined orbit	Operational	

Animation of IRNSS

Around the Earth

Around the Earth - Polar view

Earth fixed frame - Equatorial view, front

Earth fixed frame - Equatorial view, side

Earth fixed frame - Polar view

Earth · IRNSS-1B · IRNSS-1C · IRNSS-1E · IRNSS-1F · IRNSS-1G · IRNSS-1I

=== NVS series satellite ===
NVS series satellites
Satellite	SVN	PRN	Int. Sat. ID	NORAD ID	Launch Date	Launch Vehicle	Orbit	Status	Remarks
NVS-01 (IRNSS-1J)	I010	I10	2023-076A	56759	29 May 2023	GSLV Mk II - F12	Geostationary (GEO) / 129.5°E, 5.1° inclined orbit	Operational	Replaced IRNSS-1G. Features extended lifespan, indigenous clock and new civilian band L1 for low power devices.
NVS-02 (IRNSS-1K)			2025-020A	62850	29 January 2025	GSLV Mk II - F15		Partial Failure	Intended replacement of malfunctioning IRNSS-1E satellite. However, NVS-02 suffered from a propulsion system failure and the ISRO is looking for alternative uses for the satellite.
NVS-03 (IRNSS-1L)			2026-245A	101228	30 October 2026	GSLV Mk II- F18	Geosynchronous (IGSO), 111.75°E / 29.98° inclined orbit	Operational	
NVS-04 (IRNSS-1M)					H1 2027	GSLV Mk II - F19	Geosynchronous (IGSO), 32.5°E or 129.5°E, 29° inclined orbit	Planned	
NVS-05 (IRNSS-1N)					H2 2027	GSLV Mk II	Geosynchronous (IGSO), 32.5°E or 129.5°E, 29° inclined orbit	Planned	
NVS-06					H1 2028	GSLV Mk II	Geosynchronous (IGSO), 32.5°E or 129.5°E, 29° inclined orbit	Planned	

== See also ==
- Bhuvan
- Indian Space Research Organisation
- GPS-aided GEO augmented navigation (GAGAN)
- List of Indian satellites
- Indian Remote Sensing Programme (IRSP)
- Indian National Satellite System (INSAT)
- GSAT

=== Other systems ===
- BeiDou – global navigation satellite system operated by China.
- Galileo – global navigation satellite system operated by the European Union.
- GLONASS – global navigation satellite system operated by Russia.
- GPS – global navigation satellite system operated by the United States.
- QZSS – regional navigation satellite system operated by Japan, receivable in the Asia-Oceania region.
