= Indian Deep Space Network =

ISRO's observatory

- Alternative names: IDSN
- Organization: Indian Space Research Organization
- Location: Byalalu, Ramanagar district, Karnataka, India
- Coordinates: 12°54′06″N 77°22′07″E
- Established: 17 October 2008; 17 years ago
- Website: https://www.istrac.gov.in
- Telescopes: ISRO Telemetry, Tracking and Command Network

Indian Deep Space Network (IDSN) is a sophisticated telecommunications infrastructure operated by the Indian Space Research Organization (ISRO) to provide telemetry, tracking and command support its interplanetary missions. Located at the Bayalu campus near Bengaluru, Karnataka, the IDSN comprises a network of large antennas capable of communicating with spacecraft at lunar and interplanetary distances.

The network operates under the purview of ISRO Telemetry, Tracking and Command Network (ISTRAC) and functions as part of a global network, receiving complementary support from similar networks run by NASA, China, Russia, ESA, and Japan.

== Facilities and Infrastructure ==
The IDSN occupies nearly 120 acres at Bayalu, located 60 kilometers from Bengaluru. The campus houses the antenna systems, mission operations complexes and the Indian Space Science Data Centre along with other facilities and administrative buildings.

=== Mission Operation Complex (MOX) ===
The IDSN operates two Mission Operations Complexes: MOX-1 established in 2008 and MOX-2 established in 2010.

=== Indian Space Science Data Centre (ISSDC) ===
Located within the IDSN campus, ISSDC processes and archives scientific payload data from ISRO's space missions.

=== ISRO Navigation Centre (INC) ===
Byalalu campus also houses the ISRO Navigation Centre (INC). The centre became active on 12 June 2013, at the time of launch of IRNSS-1A, the first of the Indian Regional Navigation Satellite System series of satellites. The INC has a high stability atomic clock. It will be used to co-ordinate across 21 ground stations in India.

== Antenna Systems ==
Along with the existing infrastructure of the ISRO Telemetry, Tracking and Command Network (ISTRAC), the IDSN is augmented by multiple large antennas to improve the visibility duration.

=== 32-Meter S/X-Band Antenna ===
The main antenna of the network is a 32-meter antenna that employs a parabolic reflector. The antenna mount utilizes wheel-and-track system for azimuth motion. Built in a beam waveguide configuration, this state-of-the-art system has supported the Chandrayaan-1 and Mars Orbiter Mission mission operations. Currently, it supports the Chandrayaan-2 orbiter, the Aditya-L1 mission and Chandrayaan-3.

A fibre optics / satellite link will provide the necessary connectivity between the IDSN site and Spacecraft Control Centre / Network Control Centre. This antenna is designed to provide uplink in both S-Band (20/2 kW) and X-Band (2.5 kW), either through Right circular polarization or Left circular polarization. The reception capability will be in both S-Band and X-Band (simultaneous RCP & LCP). It can receive two carriers in S-Band and one carrier in X-Band, simultaneously. The system will have a G/T of 37.5/51 dB/K (45° elevation, clear sky) for S/X-Band. The base-band will adhere to CCSDS Standards facilitating cross-support among the space agencies. The station is also equipped for remote control from the ISTRAC Network Control Centre (NCC).

=== 18-Meter S/X-Band Antenna (D-18 Tarang) ===
Commissioned in November 2021, the second antenna is an indigenous 18-meter antenna that provides supplementary deep space support. It shares technical architecture with the 32m antenna at a reduced scale.

=== 11-Meter antenna ===
An additional 11-meter antenna operates at the facility for additional flexibility and lower power applications.

== Missions Supported ==
=== Chandrayaan missions ===
The Indian Deep Space Network was built to track and support India's first lunar mission Chandrayaan-1, an uncrewed lunar exploration mission. The IDSN provided continuous tracking and orbit control support and received images and data through the mission.

IDSN supported the partially successful Chandrayaan-2 mission completely, from lunar orbit insertion and lander descent to rover operations.

In 2023, the Chandrayaan-3 successfully placed a lander and rover on lunar south polar region. IDSN provided primary tracking support with supplementary supports from NASA and ESA networks.

=== Mars Orbiter Mission ===
IDSN had been used to track Mars Orbiter Mission (MOM) also known as Mangalyaan.

=== Venus Orbiter Mission ===
The 32m antenna will be used for science data collection from the Venus Orbiter Mission Spacecraft, planned to be launched in 2028.

== See also ==
- Deep Space Network
- Chinese Deep Space Network
