= Orbital state vectors =

Cartesian vectors of position and velocity of an orbiting body in space

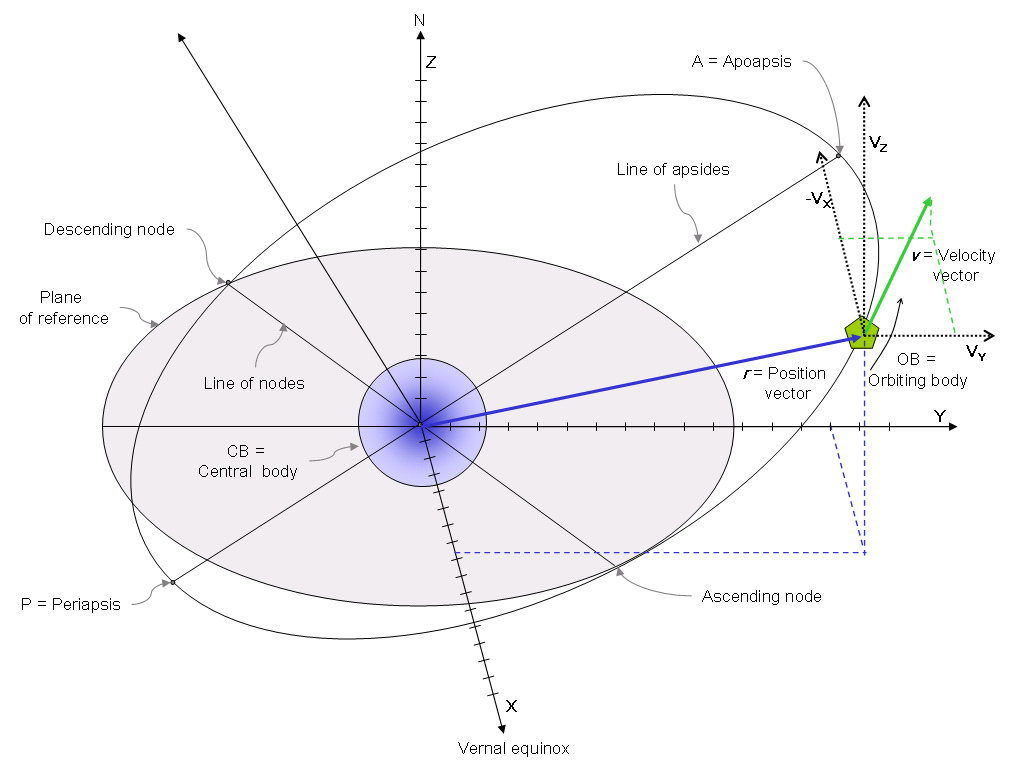
Orbital position vector, orbital velocity vector, other orbital elements

In astrodynamics and celestial dynamics, the orbital state vectors (sometimes state vectors) of an orbit are Cartesian vectors of position ($\mathbf{r}$) and velocity ($\mathbf{v}$) that together with their time (epoch) ($t$) uniquely determine the trajectory of the orbiting body in space.

Orbital state vectors come in many forms including the traditional Position-Velocity vectors, Two-line element set (TLE), and Vector Covariance Matrix (VCM).

== Frame of reference ==
State vectors are defined with respect to some frame of reference, usually but not always an inertial reference frame. One of the more popular reference frames for the state vectors of bodies moving near Earth is the Earth-centered inertial (ECI) system defined as follows:

- The origin is Earth's center of mass;
- The Z axis is coincident with Earth's rotational axis, positive northward;
- The X/Y plane coincides with Earth's equatorial plane, with the +X axis pointing toward the vernal equinox and the Y axis completing a right-handed set.

The ECI reference frame is not truly inertial because of the slow, 26,000 year precession of Earth's axis, so the reference frames defined by Earth's orientation at a standard astronomical epoch such as B1950 or J2000 are also commonly used.

Many other reference frames can be used to meet various application requirements, including those centered on the Sun or on other planets or moons, the one defined by the barycenter and total angular momentum of the Solar System (in particular the ICRF), or even a spacecraft's own orbital plane and angular momentum.

== Position and velocity vectors ==
The position vector $\mathbf{r}$ describes the position of the body in the chosen frame of reference, while the velocity vector $\mathbf{v}$ describes its velocity in the same frame at the same time. Together, these two vectors and the time at which they are valid uniquely describe the body's trajectory as detailed in Orbit determination. The principal reasoning is that Newton's law of gravitation yields an acceleration $\ddot \mathbf{r}=-GM/r^2$; if the product $GM$ of gravitational constant and attractive mass at the center of the orbit are known, position and velocity are the initial values for that second order differential equation for $\mathbf{r}(t)$ which has a unique solution.

The body does not actually have to be in orbit for its state vectors to determine its trajectory; it only has to move ballistically, i.e., solely under the effects of its own inertia and gravity. For example, it could be a spacecraft or missile in a suborbital trajectory. If other forces such as drag or thrust are significant, they must be added vectorially to those of gravity when performing the integration to determine future position and velocity.

For any object moving through space, the velocity vector is tangent to the trajectory. If $\hat{\mathbf{u}}_t$ is the unit vector tangent to the trajectory, then
$$\mathbf{v} = v\hat{\mathbf{u}}_t$$

=== Derivation ===
The velocity vector $\mathbf{v}\,$ can be derived from position vector $\mathbf{r}$ by differentiation with respect to time:
$$\mathbf{v} = \frac{d\mathbf{r}}{dt}$$

An object's state vector can be used to compute its classical or Keplerian orbital elements and vice versa. Each representation has its advantages. The elements are more descriptive of the size, shape and orientation of an orbit, and may be used to quickly and easily estimate the object's state at any arbitrary time provided its motion is accurately modeled by the two-body problem with only small perturbations.

On the other hand, the state vector is more directly useful in a numerical integration that accounts for significant, arbitrary, time-varying forces such as drag, thrust and gravitational perturbations from third bodies as well as the gravity of the primary body.

The state vectors ($\mathbf{r}$ and $\mathbf{v}$) can be easily used to compute the specific angular momentum vector as

$$\mathbf{h} = \mathbf{r}\times\mathbf{v}$$.

Because even satellites in low Earth orbit experience significant perturbations from non-spherical Earth's figure, solar radiation pressure, lunar tide, and atmospheric drag, the Keplerian elements computed from the state vector at any moment are only valid for a short period of time and need to be recomputed often to determine a valid object state. Such element sets are known as osculating elements because they coincide with the actual orbit only at that moment.

== See also ==
- ECEF
- Earth-centered inertial
- Orbital plane
- Orbit determination
- State vector (navigation)
- Radial, transverse, normal
