= Resourcesat-2A =

Indian Earth observation satellite

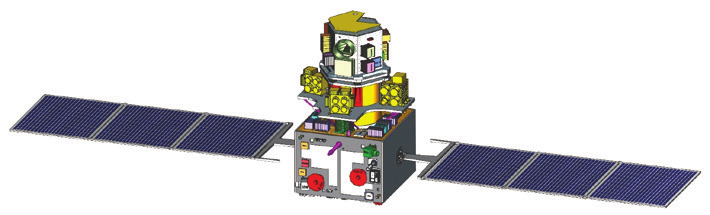
- Names: ResourceSat-2A
- Mission type: Earth observation
- Operator: ISRO
- COSPAR ID: 2016-074A
- SATCAT no.: 41877
- Website: www.isro.gov.in
- Mission duration: 5 years (planned); 9 years and 11 days (in progress)

Spacecraft properties
- Spacecraft: ResourceSat-2A
- Manufacturer: Indian Space Research Organisation
- Launch mass: 1,235 kg (2,723 lb)
- Power: 1250 watts

Start of mission
- Launch date: 7 December 2016, 04:54 UTC
- Rocket: PSLV-XL C36
- Launch site: Satish Dhawan Space Centre, First Launch Pad (FLP)
- Contractor: Indian Space Research Organisation
- Entered service: February 2017

Orbital parameters
- Reference system: Geocentric orbit
- Regime: Low Earth Orbit
- Perigee altitude: 817 km (508 mi)
- Apogee altitude: 817 km (508 mi)
- Inclination: 98.78°
- Period: 101.35 minutes

Instruments
- Advanced Wide Field Sensor (AWiFS); Linear Imaging Self-Scanning Sensor-3 (LISS-3); Linear Imaging Self-Scanning Sensor-4 (LISS-4)

Resourcesat-2A is a follow on mission to Resourcesat-1 and Resourcesat-2 which were launched in October 2003 and in April 2011 respectively. The new satellite provides the same services as the other Resourcesat missions. It will give regular micro and macro information on land and water bodies below, farm lands and crop extent, forests, mineral deposits, coastal information, rural and urban spreads besides helping in disaster management.

== Instruments ==
The satellite contains three instruments on board:

- Advanced Wide-Field Sensor (AWiFS) - it operates in three spectral bands in VNIR and one band in SWIR. It provides images with 56 meter spatial resolution that would be useful at the State level.
- Linear Imaging Self-Scanning Sensor-3 (LISS-3) - it operates in three-spectral bands, two in VNIR and one in Short Wave Infrared (SWIR) bandwidth. With 23.5 meter spatial resolution it can provide images at the district level. It has a swath of 740 km and revisit period of 5 days.
- Linear Imaging Self-Scanning Sensor-4 (LISS-4) - it operates in three spectral bands in the Visible and Near Infrared Region (VNIR) with 5.8 meter spatial resolution that can provide information at taluk level. It has swath of 70 km and revisit period of 5 days.

The satellite also carries two Solid State Recorders with a capacity of 200 Gigabits to store the images which can be read out later to ground stations.

== Launch ==
The satellite was launched aboard PSLV-C36, the 38th flight of Polar Satellite Launch Vehicle (PSLV-XL), on 7 December 2016, at 04:54 UTC. For the first time, Indian Regional Navigation Satellite System (IRNSS) processor and receiver was used to navigate PSLV.

== See also ==
- List of Indian satellites
