= PSLV-C41 =

Polar Satellite Launch Vehicle mission by ISRO

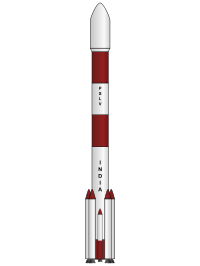

PSLV-XL launch
- Launch: 12 April 2018, 04:04:00 IST
- Operator: ISRO
- Pad: Sriharikota First
- Payload: IRNSS-1I
- Outcome: Success

PSLV launches

PSLV-C41 was the 43rd mission of the Indian Polar Satellite Launch Vehicle (PSLV) rocket. It was launched on Thursday, April 12, 2018, at 04:04 Hrs (IST) by the Indian Space Research Organisation (ISRO) from the first launch pad of the Satish Dhawan Space Centre at Sriharikota, Andhra Pradesh. This was the 12th mission to use the PSLV XL configuration.

This mission launched IRNSS-1I navigation satellite into orbit. The satellite is intended to replace the failed IRNSS-1A, and complete the constellation of geosynchronous navigation satellites after IRNSS-1H failed to do so. The satellite was successfully infected into orbit 19 minutes after lift-off. ISRO Chairman K. Sivan described the mission as a success and congratulated the scientists behind it.

== Payload ==
Like its predecessor, IRNSS-1I has two types of payloads, navigation payload and the ranging payload. The navigation payload transmits navigation service signals to the users. This payload is operating in L5 band and S band. A highly accurate Rubidium atomic clock is part of the navigation payload of the satellite. Failure of these Rubidium atomic clocks was the reason for IRNSS-1A to be deemed unfit. The satellite contains corner cube retroreflectors used for LASER ranging.

== Launch ==
Launched on April 12, 2018,

- Ignition of the core stage, followed by the ignition of the six strap-ones.
- After 70 seconds, at an altitude of 23.6 km, the boosters separated.
- Core stage separated after 110 seconds, at an altitude of 55 km.
- At 203 seconds, at 113&km, second stage ignited.
- After the payload fairing, the second stage separated at an altitude of 131.5&km.
- At 264 seconds, 132 km, third stage ignited, followed by a third stage separation at 599 seconds and 183 km height.
- At 609 seconds, 185 km, fourth stage is ignited.
- At 454.4 km, fourth stage is cut off. Soon after, the satellite is injected into a sub geosynchronous transfer orbit, which is 284 km at perigee and 20650 km at apogee. The maneuver took place above the island of New Guinea.
