= Byalalu =

- village
- Location in Karnataka, India Byalalu (India)
- Coordinates: 12.899908°N 77.373776°E
- Country: India
- State: Karnataka
- District: Bangalore south District

Government
  - Type: Panchayati raj (India)
  - Body: Gram panchayat

Population (2011)
  - Total: 2,300

Languages
  - Official: Kannada
- Time zone: UTC+5:30 (IST)
- Postal code: 562130
- ISO 3166 code: IN-KA
- Vehicle registration: KA
- Website: karnataka.gov.in

Byalalu is a village in Bangalore south District in Karnataka, India. It is an hour's drive from Bangalore city, off the Bangalore-Mysore highway. The population was reported as 2,300 in the 2011 Indian census.

== Indian Deep Space Network ==
The Indian Space Research Organisation (ISRO) set up a Deep Space Network (DSN) centre in Byalalu. One of the main advantages of having the DSN at Byalalu was its saucer-like shape that would help in blocking radio frequency disturbances. The DSN was initially set up to track Chandrayaan I, India's first lunar mission; as of September 2014, it is being used to track the ongoing Mars Orbiter Mission (MOM), known as Mangalyaan.
