= GSAT-1 =

Indian communications satellite

- Mission type: Communications; Technology
- Operator: ISRO
- COSPAR ID: 2001-015A
- SATCAT no.: 26745
- Mission duration: Failed to reach orbit

Spacecraft properties
- Bus: I-2K
- Manufacturer: ISRO
- Launch mass: 1,540 kilograms (3,400 lb)

Start of mission
- Launch date: 18 April 2001, 10:13 UTC
- Rocket: GSLV Mk.I
- Launch site: Shiharikota FLP
- Contractor: ISRO

Orbital parameters
- Reference system: Geocentric
- Regime: Medium Earth; Geostationary planned
- Longitude: 73° west (2000); 99° west (2000–2006); 76.85° west (2006–2009)
- Perigee altitude: 33,800 kilometres (21,000 mi)
- Apogee altitude: 35,725 kilometres (22,198 mi)
- Inclination: 0.9 degrees
- Period: 1384.09 minutes
- Epoch: 25 April 2001

Transponders
- Band: 3 C-band; 2 S-band

GSAT-1 was an experimental communications satellite launched aboard the maiden flight of the GSLV rocket. The spacecraft was equipped with instrumentation to test Pulse-code modulation (PCM) transmitting on S-band frequencies and transponders operating in the C-band. The spacecraft was unable to complete its mission after a launch failure left it in a lower than planned orbit and propulsion issues prevented the satellite from correcting this via its own maneuvering system.

== Overview ==
GSAT-1 failed to achieve its target orbit, which prevented it from fulfilling its primary communications mission. The 1.54 tonnes (1.52 long tons; 1.70 short tons) satellite was orbiting with a period of 23 hours two minutes, instead of the planned 24-hour geosynchronous orbit, only permitting a limited series of experiments to be conducted, including digital audio broadcasting and compressed digital TV signal transmission.

The GSLV (Geosynchronous Satellite Launch Vehicle) suffered a performance shortfall during its first flight resulting in the injection of the experimental satellite into a geosynchronous transfer orbit (GTO) of 181 by 32.051 kilometres (112.468 mi × 19.916 mi), inclined at 19.2 degrees, having an apogee about 4,000 kilometres (2,500 mi) below the targeted orbit of 185 by 35.975 kilometres (114.954 mi × 22.354 mi). The satellite used its onboard propulsion system to raise both its apogee and its perigee to geostationary orbit as well as to decrease the orbital inclination to zero, however its propellant was depleted prior to successfully raising its orbit. The satellite used two different propellant tanks, built in Germany and India, which resulted in an unequal flow of fuel, causing the spacecraft to tilt. (The two different fuel tanks were used because they were readily available). Recovery required the use of more propellant than planned which resulted in the satellite having no propellant left to complete its final circularization maneuver. The satellite was possibly used for a few communications experiments but the original purpose of demonstrating digital TV and audio broadcasts, as well as Internet services could not be fulfilled.

The Russian 12KRB cryogenic upper stage was planned to perform for 710 seconds, but its burn apparently lasted only 698 seconds. Another suspect for the shortfall is the launch vehicle navigation system which was derived from the PSLV which has flown only to low earth orbits.

=== Launch attempt summary ===
Attempt	Planned	Result	Turnaround	Reason	Decision point	Weather go (%)	Notes
1	28 Mar 2001, 10:00:00 am	Scrubbed	—		28 Mar 2001, 12:00 am		Abborted due to some engines related issues in the terminal count.
2	18 Apr 2001, 10:13:00 am	Partial failure	21 days 0 hours 13 minutes				Payload placed into lower than planned orbit, and did not have sufficient fuel to reach a usable orbit.

== See also ==
- List of Indian satellites
