= Indian Space Science Data Centre =

Indian research facility

Indian Space Science Data Center
Agency overview
- Formed: 17-Oct-2008
- Parent agency: ISRO
- Website: www.issdc.gov.in

The Indian Space Science Data Center (ISSDC) is a ground segment facility being established by ISRO in October 2008, as the primary data center for the payload data archives of Indian Space Science Missions. This data center, located at the Indian Deep Space Network (IDSN) campus in Bangalore, is responsible for the ingestion, archive, processing, and dissemination of the payload data and related ancillary data for Space Science missions. The primary user of this facility will be the principal investigators of the science payloads. In addition to them the data will be made accessible to scientist from other institution and also to the general public. The facility has supported Chandrayaan-1, AstroSat, Youthsat, Mars Orbiter Mission, and Megha-tropiques and will be supporting any other future space science missions.

== Missions ==
Some of the missions the ISSDC has served and is currently contributing to are:

- Chandrayaan-1 (CH1)
- Youthsat (YS1)
- Meghatropiques (MT1)
- MARS Orbiter Mission (MOM)
- AstroSat (AS1)
- Resourcesat-2/AIS-SB (Satellite-based Automatic Identification System)
- Chandrayaan-2 (CH2)
- Chandrayaan-3 (CH3)
- Aditya-L1 (AL1)
- XPoSat (X01)

== Functioning ==
Payload data from the satellites will be received at the data reception stations and subsequently transferred to ISSDC for further processing.

The raw payload data received through the data reception stations is further processed to generate Level-0 and Level-1 data products that are stored in the ISSDC archives for subsequent dissemination. Automation in the entire chain of data processing is planned. Raw payload data / Level-0 data/ Level-1 data for each science payload is transferred to the respective Payload Operations Centers (POC) for further processing, analysis and generation of higher level data products. The higher level data products generated by the POC's are subsequently transferred to ISSDC archives for storage and dissemination. The data archives for Level-0 and higher products are organized following the Planetary Data System (PDS) standards.

The dissemination of data from ISSDC to the payload operations centers / principal investigators, scientists and general public is supported through private WAN connections and Internet.

Software packages developed by software development teams in the different centers of ISRO, by the principal investigator's teams / payload development teams are to be deployed at ISSDC to support these functions.

== Facilities ==
ISSDC data archival and distribution functions follow the data policy guidelines of ISRO. The data transfer system at ISSDC, with suitable security systems, provides for distribution of science data (as per data policy). After a pre-specified proprietary period, ISSDC would make the data available to public users who can access the archives through the Internet.

ISSDC supports six primary services; viz Access Services, Interchange Services, Archive Services, Support Services, Operations Services and Maintenance Services.

ISSDC interfaces with Mission Operations Complex, Data reception centers, Payload designers, Payload operations centers, Principal investigators, Mission software developers and Science data users to execute its functions.

The primary facilities for ISSDC have been established at the IDSN site, Byalalu at Bangalore.
