= Advanced Technology Vehicle =

Indian sounding rockets

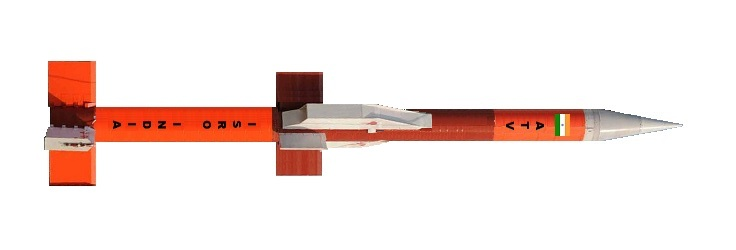
- Function: Experimental scramjet testbed
- Manufacturer: ISRO
- Country of origin: India

Size
- Height: 9.10 m (29.9 ft)
- Diameter: 0.56 m (1.8 ft)
- Mass: 3,000 kg (6,600 lb)
- Stages: 2

Associated rockets
- Family: Rohini-560

Launch history
- Status: Active
- Launch sites: Satish Dhawan Space Centre
- Total launches: 2
- Success(es): 2
- First flight: 3 March 2010
- Last flight: 28 August 2016

The Advanced Technology Vehicle is a modified Indian sounding rocket developed by ISRO. It is based on the Rohini-560 rocket. The ATV programme was created to test the development of a native dual-mode air-breathing scramjet engine. As of 2016, ISRO has flown two test missions.

== ATV-01 ==
On 3 March 2010 at 03:00 UTC, the Indian Space Research Organisation (ISRO) conducted the first test flight of the Advanced Technology Vehicle, designated ATV-D01. It weighed 3,000 kilograms (6,600 lb) at lift-off, and measured 9.10 metres (29.9 ft) long with a diameter of 0.56 metres (1.8 ft). It carried a passive scramjet engine combustor module as a demonstration of the air-breathing propulsion technology. The ATV successfully reached Mach 6 for seven seconds and maintained a dynamic pressure of 80 kilopascals (12 psi).

== ATV-02 ==
On 28 August 2016 at 00:30 UTC, the second test flight, designated ATV-D02, was launched from the Satish Dhawan Space Centre. Massing 3,277 kilograms (7,225 lb), the rocket carried an active scramjet engine demonstrator. At 55 seconds into the flight, the scramjets ignited at Mach 6 and functioned for about 5 seconds. The flight lasted a total of about 300 seconds and splashed down in the Bay of Bengal approximately 320 kilometres (200 mi) from the space centre.

Flame was sustained in one engine for 18 seconds and in the other for 14 seconds, producing net positive thrust.

== ATV-03 ==
On 23 July 2024, ISRO effectively concluded the experimental flight demonstration of air breathing propulsion technology. Air breathing propulsion systems were symmetrically placed on both sides of the RH-560 sounding rocket used in the experiment. The air breathing propulsion systems were ignited successfully and the test performed satisfactorily. 110 parameters were extensively watched during the flight to evaluate the propulsion system's performance.

== See also ==
- RLV TD Programme
