= IRNSS-1F =

Indian navigation satellite

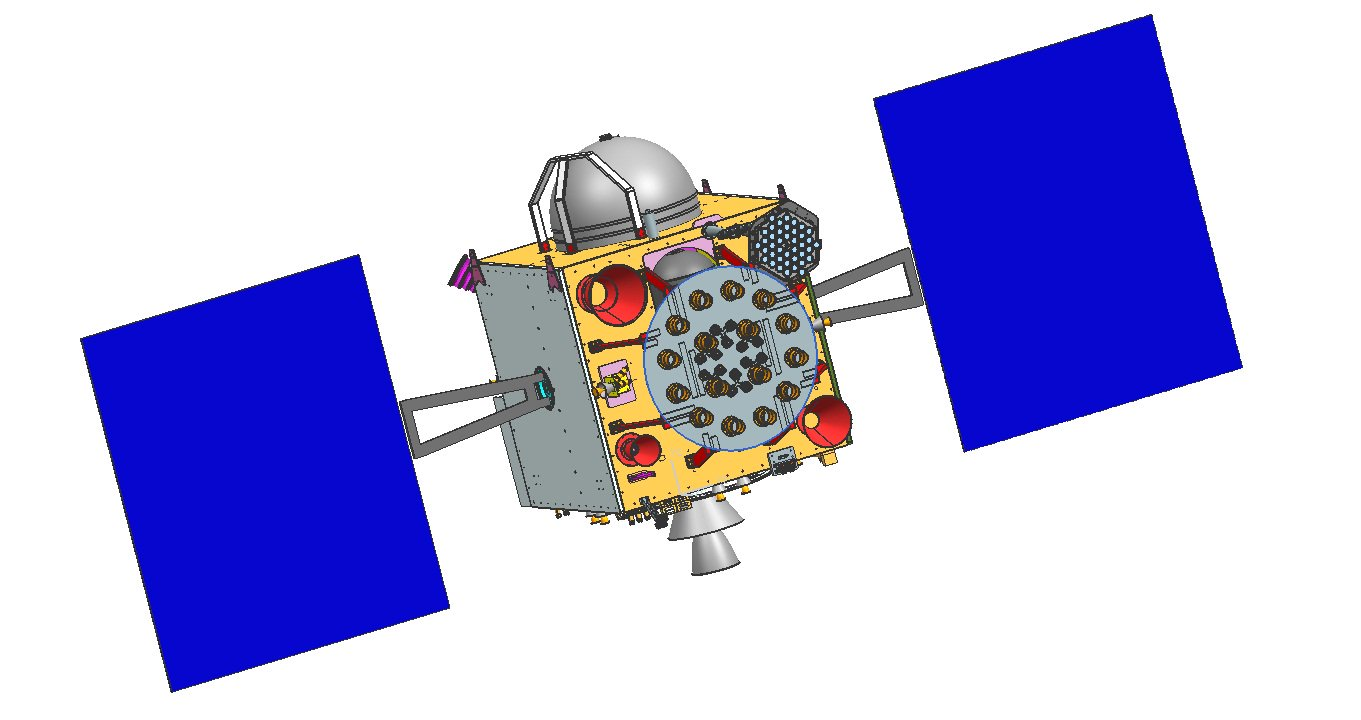
- Mission type: Navigation
- Operator: ISRO
- COSPAR ID: 2016-015A
- SATCAT no.: 41384
- Website: http://www.isro.gov.in/Spacecraft/irnss-1f
- Mission duration: Planned: 12 years Elapsed: 10 years, 6 months, 15 days

Spacecraft properties
- Spacecraft: IRNSS-1F
- Spacecraft type: Satellite
- Bus: I-1K
- Manufacturer: ISRO Satellite Centre; Space Applications Centre
- Launch mass: 1,425 kilograms (3,142 lb)
- Dry mass: 598 kilograms (1,318 lb)
- Power: 1660 W

Start of mission
- Launch date: 10:31, March 10, 2016 (UTC)
- Rocket: PSLV-XL C32
- Launch site: Satish Dhawan Second
- Contractor: ISRO

Orbital parameters
- Reference system: Geocentric
- Regime: Sub-Geosynchronous Transfer Orbit (sub-GTO)
- Perigee altitude: 35,708 km (22,188 mi)
- Apogee altitude: 35,862 km (22,284 mi)
- Inclination: 32.5 deg E

IRNSS-1F is the sixth navigation satellite out of seven in the Indian Regional Navigational Satellite System (IRNSS) series of satellites after IRNSS-1A, IRNSS-1B, IRNSS-1C, IRNSS-1D and IRNSS-1E. The satellite is one among the seven of the IRNSS constellation of satellites launched to provide navigational services to the region.

== Launch ==
It was launched aboard a PSLV-XL rocket bearing flight number C32 and was successfully put into geosynchronous orbit at 1601 hrs IST on 10 March 2016.

== Spacecraft ==
The satellite carries two types of payloads. The navigation payload transmit navigation service signals to users and ranging payload consists of C-band transponder that facilitates accurate determination of the range of the satellite.

It carries Corner Cube Retro Reflectors for laser ranging.

IRNSS-1F has a 12-year mission life. According to a press release by ISRO on 13 May 2026, the satellite's imported atomic clock stopped functioning. The satellite will be used to provide one way broadcast messaging services from thereon. The satellite stopped its primary functions on 10 March.

Animation of IRNSS

Around the Earth

Around the Earth - Polar view

Earth fixed frame - Equatorial view, front

Earth fixed frame - Equatorial view, side

Earth fixed frame - Polar view

Earth · IRNSS-1B · IRNSS-1C · IRNSS-1E · IRNSS-1F · IRNSS-1G · IRNSS-1I

== See also ==
- Communication-Centric Intelligence Satellite (CCI-Sat)
- GPS-aided geo-augmented navigation (GAGAN)
- Satellite navigation
