= INSAT-4C =

Destroyed Indian communications satellite

- Mission type: Communications
- Operator: INSAT
- Mission duration: 10 years planned Failed to orbit

Spacecraft properties
- Bus: I-2K
- Manufacturer: ISRO
- Launch mass: 2,168 kilograms (4,780 lb)
- Dry mass: 950 kilograms (2,090 lb)

Start of mission
- Launch date: 10 July 2006, 12:08 UTC
- Rocket: GSLV Mk.I
- Launch site: Satish Dhawan SLP
- Contractor: ISRO

INSAT-4C was an Indian communications satellite which was lost in a launch failure in 2006. Had it reached orbit, it would have formed part of the Indian National Satellite System. Launched in 2007, it was intended to have operated in geostationary orbit at a longitude of 73.97° east. The INSAT-4CR satellite, launched in September 2007, replaced it.

Built by the Indian Space Research Organisation, INSAT-4C was based upon the I-2K satellite bus. It had a dry mass of 950 kilograms (2,090 lb), or 2,168 kilograms (4,780 lb) when fully fuelled. It was expected to have operated for ten years. The satellite carried twelve Ku band transponders, with two solar arrays to generate power.

ISRO launched INSAT-4C on the second operational flight of the Geosynchronous Satellite Launch Vehicle, which was flying in the Mk.I configuration. The launch took place from the Second Launch Pad at the Satish Dhawan Space Centre; the first time the pad was used by a GSLV. Liftoff occurred at 12:08 UTC on 10 July 2006. Early in the flight a thrust controller in one of the four liquid rocket boosters failed, resulting in the booster cutting off shortly afterwards. Approximately 55 seconds after launch the vehicle veered off-course and began to disintegrate. The range safety officer subsequently commanded the remainder of the rocket to self-destruct.
