= IRNSS-1G =

Indian navigation satellite

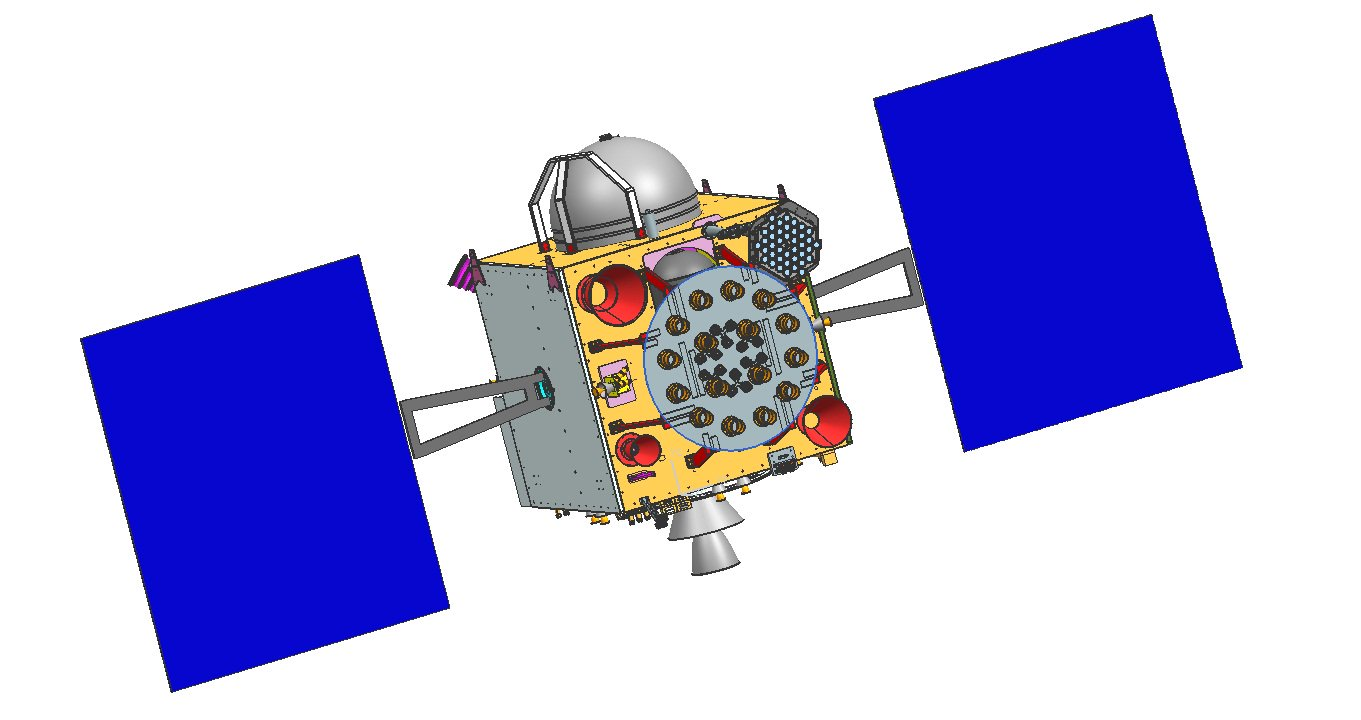
- Mission type: Navigation
- Operator: ISRO
- COSPAR ID: 2016-027A
- SATCAT no.: 41469
- Mission duration: Planned: 12 years Elapsed: 10 years, 4 months, 27 days

Spacecraft properties
- Spacecraft: IRNSS-1G
- Spacecraft type: Satellite
- Bus: I-1K
- Manufacturer: ISRO Satellite Centre; Space Applications Centre
- Launch mass: 1,425 kilograms (3,142 lb)
- Dry mass: 598 kilograms (1,318 lb)
- Power: 1600 W

Start of mission
- Launch date: 12:50, April 28, 2016 (+05:30)
- Rocket: PSLV-XL C33
- Launch site: Satish Dhawan (First)
- Contractor: ISRO

Orbital parameters
- Reference system: Geocentric
- Regime: Geosynchronous Orbit (GSO)
- Longitude: 129.429213 East
- Perigee altitude: 35,780.961 km (22,233.258 mi)
- Apogee altitude: 35,796.200 km (22,242.727 mi)
- Inclination: 4.2637
- Period: 23:56:12.33
- Epoch: 17151.68965311

IRNSS-1G was the seventh and final of the Indian Regional Navigation Satellite System (IRNSS) series of satellites after IRNSS-1A, IRNSS-1B, IRNSS-1C, IRNSS-1D, IRNSS-1E and IRNSS-1F. This system of satellites will provide navigational services to the Indian region. The satellite was launched successfully on 28 April 2016 at 07:20 UTC.

IRNSS-1G along IRNSS-1A is being used only for NavIC's short message broadcast service and not for navigation.

== Launch ==
The satellite was launched from the First Launch Pad (FLP) of Satish Dhawan Space Centre, Sriharikota on board PSLV-C33 XL on 28 April 2016 at 12:50 PM IST. The countdown of the launch had begun 51:30 hours before at 9:20 AM IST on 25 April 2016.

After the launch of IRNSS-1G the Indian government named the IRNSS system as NAVIC (Navigation with Indian Constellation).

== Specifications ==
Mission life: 12 years (planned).

Lift-off mass:1,425 kilograms (3,142 lb)

Dry mass: 598 kilograms (1,318 lb).

Payload: CDMA ranging payload in C band. Navigation payload in L-5 and S band spectrums and Rubidium atomic clocks.

Power: Two triple-junction solar panels to generate 1660W of energy and one Lithium-ion 90A-hr battery is used.

Propulsion: MMH/MON3 based bipropellant system with 12×22N Attitude control thrusters and one 440N LAM.

Orbit: Geosynchronous orbit at 129.5° East longitude with 5° inclination.

Cost: Approximately ₹125 crore (US$13 million).

Animation of IRNSS

Around the Earth

Around the Earth - Polar view

Earth fixed frame - Equatorial view, front

Earth fixed frame - Equatorial view, side

Earth fixed frame - Polar view

Earth · IRNSS-1B · IRNSS-1C · IRNSS-1E · IRNSS-1F · IRNSS-1G · IRNSS-1I

== See also ==
- Communication-Centric Intelligence Satellite (CCI-Sat)
- GPS-aided geo-augmented navigation (GAGAN)
- Satellite navigation
