= IRNSS-1E =

Indian navigation satellite

PSLV-C31/IRNSS-1E
- Mission type: Navigation
- Operator: ISRO
- COSPAR ID: 2016-003A
- SATCAT no.: 41241
- Website: http://www.isro.gov.in/Spacecraft/irnss-1e
- Mission duration: Planned: 12 years Elapsed: 10 years, 1 month, 7 days

Spacecraft properties
- Spacecraft: IRNSS-1E
- Spacecraft type: Satellite
- Bus: I-1K
- Manufacturer: ISRO Satellite Centre; Space Applications Centre
- Launch mass: 1,425 kilograms (3,142 lb)
- Dry mass: 598 kilograms (1,318 lb)
- Power: 1660 W

Start of mission
- Launch date: 09:31, 20 January 2016 (UTC)
- Rocket: PSLV-C31
- Launch site: Satish Dhawan Second
- Contractor: ISRO

Orbital parameters
- Reference system: Geocentric
- Regime: Geosynchronous
- Longitude: 111.75°E
- Inclination: 28.09°

IRNSS-1E is the fifth out of seven in the Indian Regional Navigational Satellite System (IRNSS) series of satellites after IRNSS-1A, IRNSS-1B, IRNSS-1C and IRNSS-1D. It is one among the seven of the IRNSS constellation of satellites launched to provide navigational services to the region. The satellite was placed in geosynchronous orbit. IRNSS-1E has been successfully launched into orbit on 20 January 2016 In 2025, IRNSS-1E was planned to be replaced at its orbital slot of 111.75ºE by NVS-02. However, following the failure of NVS-02, IRNSS-1E will countinue to remain at its slot.

== Satellite ==
IRNSS-1E will help augmenting the satellite based navigation system of India which is currently under development. The navigational system so developed will be regional, targeted towards South Asia. The satellite will provide navigation, tracking and mapping services.

The satellite will have two payloads: a navigation payload and CDMA ranging payload in addition with a laser retro-reflector. The payload generates navigation signals at L5 and S-band. The design of the payload makes the IRNSS system interoperable and compatible with Global Positioning System (GPS) and Galileo. The satellite is powered by two solar arrays, which generate power up to 1,660 watts, and has a designed life-time of twelve years.

== Launcher ==
The Polar Satellite Launch Vehicle, in its 33rd flight (PSLV-C31), launched IRNSS-1E from the Second Launch Pad (SLP) of Satish Dhawan Space Centre (SDSC), Sriharikota. As in the previous four launches of IRNSS satellites, PSLV-C31 will use ‘XL’ version of PSLV.

Animation of IRNSS

Around the Earth

Around the Earth - Polar view

Earth fixed frame - Equatorial view, front

Earth fixed frame - Equatorial view, side

Earth fixed frame - Polar view

Earth · IRNSS-1B · IRNSS-1C · IRNSS-1E · IRNSS-1F · IRNSS-1G · IRNSS-1I

== See also ==
- List of IRNSS satellites
- Communication-Centric Intelligence Satellite (CCI-Sat)
- GPS-aided geo-augmented navigation (GAGAN)
- Satellite navigation
