= Earth-centered, Earth-fixed coordinate system =

3-D coordinate system centered on the Earth

The ECEF coordinates (x, y, z) shown in relation to latitude and longitude

The Earth-centered, Earth-fixed coordinate system (acronym ECEF), also known as the geocentric coordinate system, is a cartesian spatial reference system that represents locations in the vicinity of the Earth (including its surface, interior, atmosphere, and surrounding outer space) as X, Y, and Z measurements from its center of mass. Its most common use is in tracking the orbits of satellites and in satellite navigation systems for measuring locations on the surface of the Earth, but it is also used in applications such as tracking crustal motion.

The distance from a given point of interest to the center of Earth is called the geocentric distance, $R=\sqrt{X^2 + Y^2 + Z^2}$, which is a generalization of the geocentric radius, R_{0}, not restricted to points on the reference ellipsoid surface. The geocentric altitude is a type of altitude defined as the difference between the two aforementioned quantities: h′ = R − R_{0}; it is not to be confused for the geodetic altitude.

Conversions between ECEF and geodetic coordinates (latitude and longitude) are discussed at geographic coordinate conversion.

== Structure ==
As with any spatial reference system, ECEF consists of an abstract coordinate system (in this case, a conventional three-dimensional right-handed system), and a geodetic datum that binds the coordinate system to actual locations on the Earth. The ECEF that is used for the Global Positioning System (GPS) is the geocentric WGS 84, which currently includes its own ellipsoid definition. Other local datums such as NAD 83 may also be used. Due to differences between datums, the ECEF coordinates for a location will be different for different datums, although the differences between most modern datums is relatively small, within a few meters.

The ECEF coordinate system has the following parameters:

- The origin at the center of the chosen ellipsoid. In WGS 84, this is center of mass of the Earth.
- The Z axis is the line between the North and South Poles, with positive values increasing northward. In WGS 84, this is the international reference pole (IRP), which does not exactly coincide with the Earth's rotational axis The slight "wobbling" of the rotational axis is known as polar motion, and can actually be measured against an ECEF.
- The X axis is in the plane of the equator, passing through the origin and extending from 180° longitude (negative) to the prime meridian (positive); in WGS 84, this is the IERS Reference Meridian.
- The Y axis is also in the plane of the equator, passing through extending from 90°W longitude (negative) to 90°E longitude (positive)

An example is the NGS data for a brass disk near Donner Summit, in California. Given the dimensions of the ellipsoid, the conversion from lat/lon/height-above-ellipsoid coordinates to X-Y-Z is straightforward—calculate the X-Y-Z for the given lat-lon on the surface of the ellipsoid and add the X-Y-Z vector that is perpendicular to the ellipsoid there and has length equal to the point's height above the ellipsoid. The reverse conversion is harder: given X-Y-Z can immediately get longitude, but no closed formula for latitude and height exists. See "Geodetic system." Using Bowring's formula in 1976 Survey Review the first iteration gives latitude correct within 10^{-11} degree as long as the point is within 10,000 meters above or 5,000 meters below the ellipsoid.

== In astronomy ==
Geocentric coordinates can be used for locating astronomical objects in the Solar System in three dimensions along the Cartesian X, Y, and Z axes. They are differentiated from topocentric coordinates, which use the observer's location as the reference point for bearings in altitude and azimuth.

For nearby stars, astronomers use heliocentric coordinates, with the center of the Sun as the origin. The plane of reference can be aligned with the Earth's celestial equator, the ecliptic, or the Milky Way's galactic equator. These 3D celestial coordinate systems add actual distance as the Z axis to the equatorial, ecliptic, and galactic coordinate systems used in spherical astronomy.

An example of Earth-centered frame

Polar view, Earth-centered inertial

Polar view, Earth-centered, Earth fixed

- Earth
- IRNSS-1B
- IRNSS-1C
- IRNSS-1E
- IRNSS-1F
- IRNSS-1G
- IRNSS-1I
(IRNSS are geosynchronous satellites)

== See also ==
- Earth-centered inertial (ECI)
- Geodetic system
- International Terrestrial Reference System and Frame (ITRS)
- Orbital state vectors
- Planetary coordinate system
