= IRNSS-1I =

Indian navigation satellite

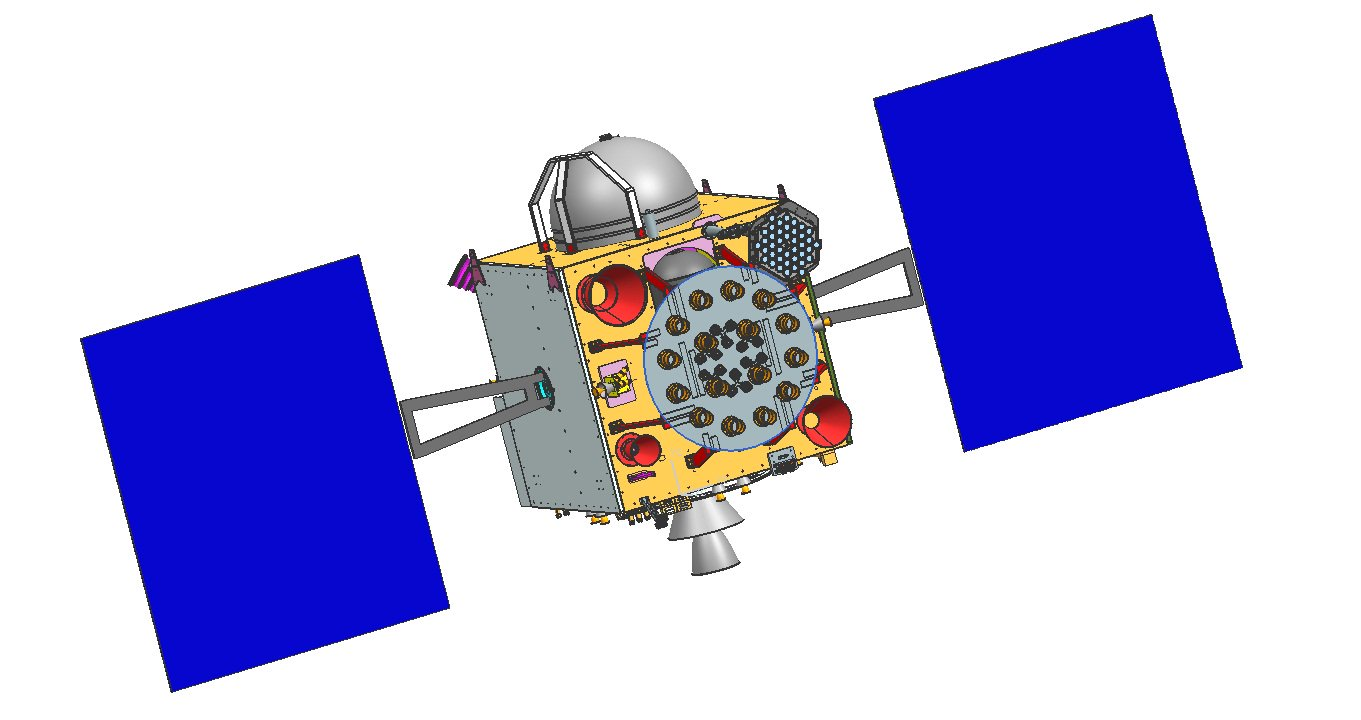
- IRNSS series one spacecraft
- Mission type: Navigation
- Operator: ISRO
- COSPAR ID: 2018-035A
- SATCAT no.: 43286
- Mission duration: Planned: 10 years Elapsed: 8 years, 5 months, 14 days

Spacecraft properties
- Manufacturer: ISRO Satellite Centre; Space Applications Centre
- Launch mass: 1,425 kilograms (3,142 lb)
- Dry mass: 600 kilograms (1,300 lb)

Start of mission
- Launch date: 11 April 2018, 22:34 UTC
- Rocket: PSLV-XL PSLV-C41
- Launch site: Satish Dhawan SLP
- Contractor: ISRO

Orbital parameters
- Reference system: Geocentric
- Regime: Geosynchronous
- Longitude: 55° E
- Inclination: 29°
- Period: 1450.9 minutes

IRNSS-1I is an Indian navigational satellite that forms part of the Indian Regional Navigational Satellite System. IRNSS-1I is the ninth satellite launched for the IRNSS constellation and one of five IRNSS satellites currently operational. The satellite is intended to replace the failed IRNSS-1A, and complete the constellation of geosynchronous navigation satellites after IRNSS-1H failed to do so. The satellite's assembly, integration and testing is partly done by a consortium of six small firms led by Alpha Design Technologies, a Bengaluru-based aerospace firm under URSC's supervision.

== Payload ==
Like its predecessor, IRNSS-1I has two types of payloads, navigation payload and the ranging payload. The navigation payload transmits navigation service signals to the users. This payload is operating in L5 band and S band. A highly accurate rubidium atomic clock is part of the navigation payload of the satellite; failure of these rubidium atomic clocks was the reason IRNSS-1A was deemed unfit. The ranging payload consists of transponder which is operated in CDMA mode for two-way range measurements. The IRNSS satellites continuously emits time stamped navigation signals, which are received by the ground-based user receivers. The information is then processed by the receivers to derive their own position, velocity and time. The system provides seamless, uninterrupted services under all weather conditions.

== Satellite ==
The satellite will help in completing the satellite based navigation system of India which is currently under development. The IRNSS space segment consists of seven satellites. After the failure of all three rubidium Atomic clocks on-board IRNSS-1A and the failure of IRNSS-1H to separate from the heat shield of the launch vehicle, IRNSS constellation remains incomplete without this satellite.

== Launch ==
IRNSS-1I was successfully launched aboard the 43rd flight of PSLV (PSLV-C41) on 11 April 2018.

Animation of IRNSS

Around the Earth

Around the Earth - Polar view

Earth fixed frame - Equatorial view, front

Earth fixed frame - Equatorial view, side

Earth fixed frame - Polar view

Earth · IRNSS-1B · IRNSS-1C · IRNSS-1E · IRNSS-1F · IRNSS-1G · IRNSS-1I

== See also ==
- Communication-Centric Intelligence Satellite (CCI-Sat)
- GPS-aided geo-augmented navigation (GAGAN)
- Satellite navigation
