= GSLV-F12 =

2023 Indian satellite launch mission

GSLV - F12
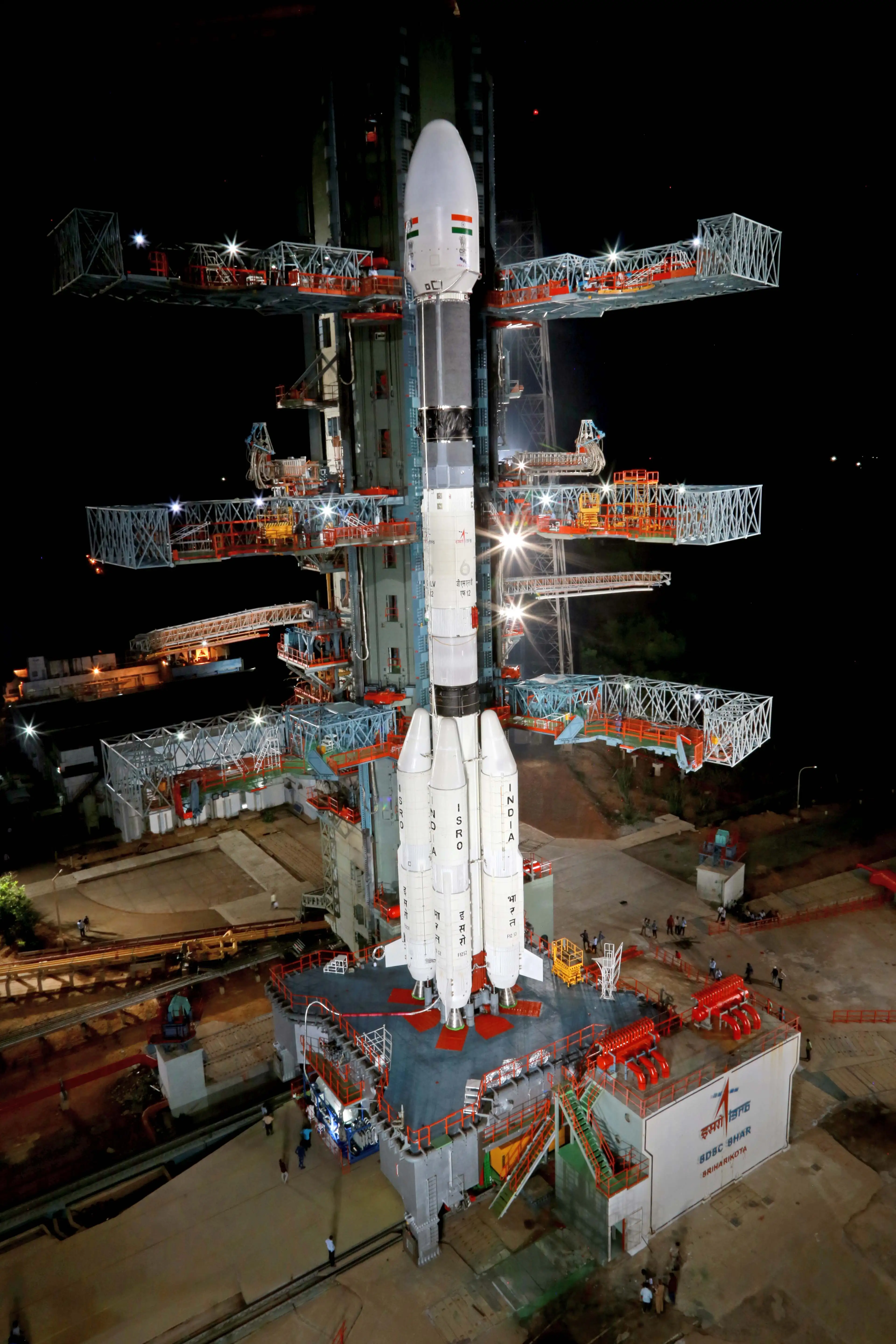

launch
- Launch: Launched on 29th May 2023 at 0512 hrs UTC
- Pad: Second Launch Pad Satish Dhawan Space Centre
- Payload: (India) NVS-01

GSLV launches

The GSLV F12 is the 15th flight of the GSLV and the 9th flight of Mk2 variant using indigenous Cryogenic engine.

== Launch ==
Launch of GSLV F12 / NVS 01 Mission is Tentatively Scheduled for Monday, 29th May 2023 at 0512 hrs UTC from Satish Dhawan Space Centre, Second Launch pad, Sriharikota Andhra Pradesh, India as Per Notam .

== Mission overview ==
Primary payload: NVS-01

This also marks the 15th time that Geosynchronous Satellite Launch Vehicle will be launching the Satellites.

This Launch Vehicle is an 3 Stage Launch Vehicle. The first stage of GSLV was also derived from the PSLV's PS1. The 138 tonne solid rocket motor is augmented by 4 liquid strap-ons which is Powered by Vikas (rocket engine).

Launch Vehicle Stages
Stage	Propellant Type	Max. Thrust	Burn Time
GS1	Solid	4800 kN	100 Sec
GS2	Liquid	846 kN	150 Sec
CUS	Liquid	75 kN	814 sec
