= IRNSS-1D =

Indian Earth observation satellite, 2015–2025

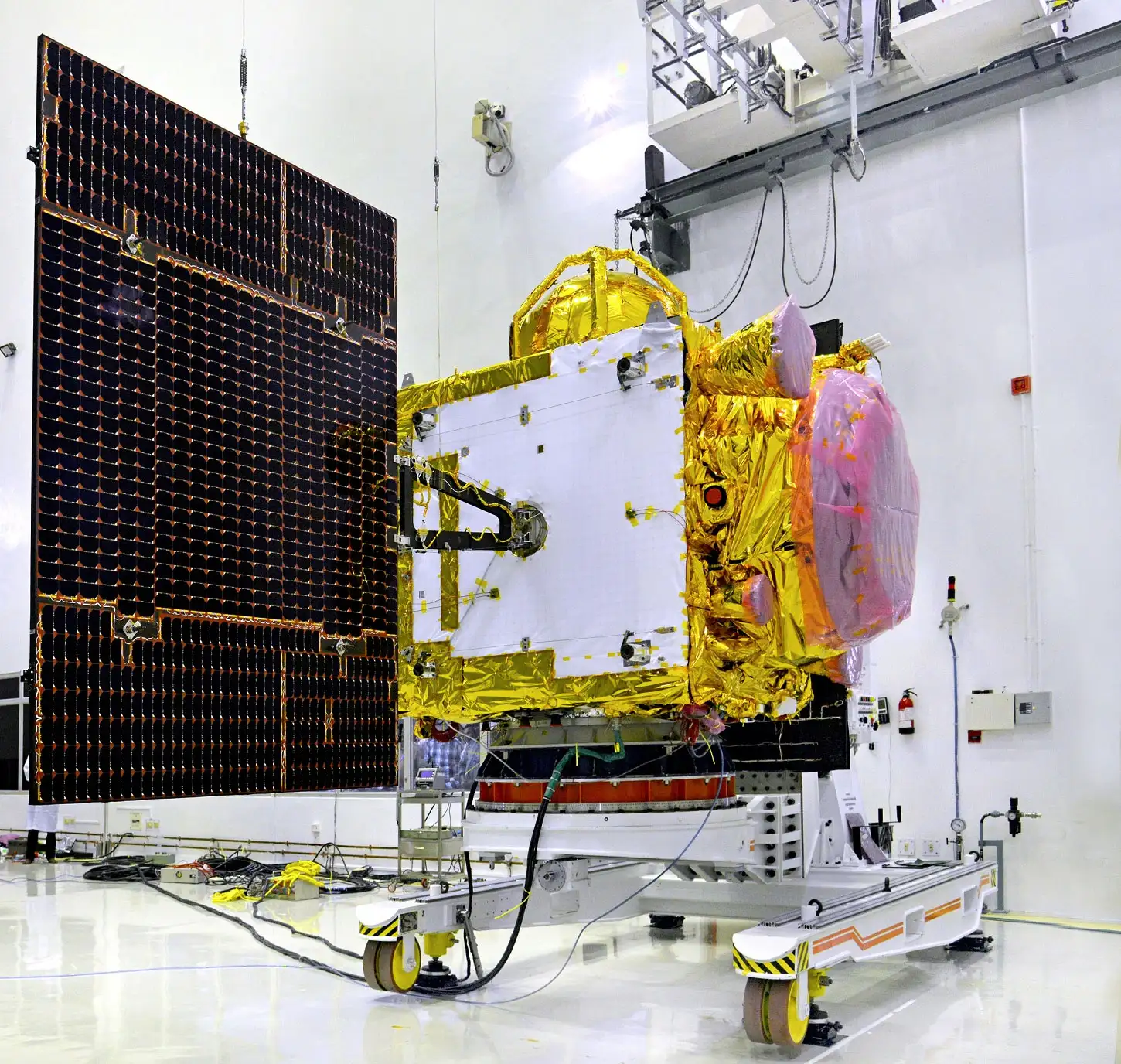
- Mission type: Navigation
- Operator: ISRO
- COSPAR ID: 2015-018A
- SATCAT no.: 40547
- Website: http://www.isro.gov.in/Spacecraft/irnss-1d
- Mission duration: Planned: 12 years Elapsed: 10 years, 9 months, 3 days

Spacecraft properties
- Spacecraft: IRNSS-1D
- Bus: I-1K
- Manufacturer: ISRO Satellite Centre; Space Applications Centre
- Launch mass: 1,425 kilograms (3,142 lb)
- Dry mass: 598 kilograms (1,318 lb)
- Power: 1,660 W

Start of mission
- Launch date: 11:49, March 28, 2015 (UTC)
- Rocket: PSLV-XL C27
- Launch site: Satish Dhawan SLP
- Contractor: ISRO

End of mission
- Deactivated: 2025

Orbital parameters
- Reference system: Geocentric
- Regime: Geosynchronous
- Longitude: 111.75° East
- Perigee altitude: 35,750.0 km (22,214.0 mi)
- Apogee altitude: 35,884.1 km (22,297.3 mi)
- Inclination: 30.43 degrees
- Period: 1436.1 minutes
- Epoch: 5 May 2015, 20:43:00 UTC

IRNSS-1D was a satellite in the Indian Regional Navigational Satellite System (IRNSS) constellation. The satellite is the fourth of seven in the constellation, launched after IRNSS-1A, IRNSS-1B and IRNSS-1C. The satellite is the only satellite in the constellation slated to provide navigational services to the region. The satellite was placed in geosynchronous orbit. It was launched successfully on 28 March 2015 onboard ISRO's PSLV-C27 from Satish Dhawan Space Centre, Sriharikota.

== Satellite ==
The satellite will help in augmenting the satellite based navigation system of India which is currently under development. The navigational system so developed will be a regional one targeted towards South Asia. The satellite will provide navigation, tracking and mapping services.

IRNSS-1D satellite has two payloads: a navigation payload and CDMA ranging payload in addition with a laser retro-reflector. The payload generates navigation signals at L5 and S-band. The design of the payload makes the IRNSS system inter-operable and compatible with Global Positioning System (GPS) and Galileo. The satellite is powered by two solar arrays, which generate power up to 1,660 watts, and has a life-time of ten years.

=== Cost ===
The total cost of the mission was estimated at ₹14 billion.

=== Retirement ===
At its end-of-mission, the IRNSS-1D satellite was raised to a graveyard orbit nearly 600 kilometres (370 mi) above the geostationary belt and passivated. Unlike other ISRO geostationary satellites who were disposed of in super-synchronous orbits, IRNSS-1D was the first to be disposed of in an inclined geosychronosis orbit.

== See also ==
- Communication-Centric Intelligence Satellite (CCI-Sat)
- GPS-aided geo-augmented navigation (GAGAN)
- Satellite navigation
