= IRNSS-1C =

Indian navigation satellite

PSLV-C26/IRNSS-1C
- Mission type: Navigation
- Operator: ISRO
- COSPAR ID: 2014-061A
- SATCAT no.: 40269
- Mission duration: Planned: 10 years Elapsed: 11 years, 11 months, 10 days

Spacecraft properties
- Spacecraft: IRNSS-1D
- Bus: I-1K
- Manufacturer: ISRO Satellite Centre; Space Applications Centre
- Launch mass: 1,424.5 kilograms (3,140 lb)
- Dry mass: 598 kilograms (1,318 lb)
- Power: 1,660 W

Start of mission
- Launch date: 15 October 2014, 20:02 UTC
- Rocket: PSLV-XL C26
- Launch site: Satish Dhawan FLP
- Contractor: ISRO

Orbital parameters
- Reference system: Geocentric
- Regime: Geostationary
- Longitude: 83° East
- Perigee altitude: 35,697 kilometres (22,181 mi)
- Apogee altitude: 35,889 kilometres (22,300 mi)
- Inclination: 4.78 degrees
- Period: 1436.12 minutes
- Epoch: 23 January 2015, 21:16:09 UTC

IRNSS-1C is the third out of seven in the Indian Regional Navigation Satellite System (IRNSS) series of satellites after IRNSS-1A and IRNSS-1B. The IRNSS constellation of satellites is slated to be launched to provide navigational services to the region. It was launched on 15 October 2014 at 20:02 UTC by PSLV-C26 and will be placed in geostationary orbit.

== Satellite ==
The satellite will help augmenting the satellite based navigation system of India which is currently under development. The navigational system so developed will be a regional one targeted towards South Asia. The satellite will provide navigation, tracking and mapping services.

IRNSS-1C satellite will have two payloads: a navigation payload and CDMA ranging payload in addition with a laser retro-reflector. The payload generates navigation signals at L5 and S-band. The design of the payload makes the IRNSS system inter-operable and compatible with Global Positioning System (GPS) and Galileo systems. The satellite is powered by two solar arrays, which generate up to 1,660 watts, and has a life-time of ten years.

IRNSS-1C was launched successfully on 16 October 2014 at 1:32 am IST from Satish Dhawan Space Centre in Sriharikota. An update from ISRO's official Facebook page on 18 October 2014 states that

Navigation Satellite IRNSS 1C Update:

The second orbit raising operation of IRNSS-1C is successfully completed by firing the Apogee Motor for 1,563 seconds. The current orbital parameters are:

Animation of IRNSS

Around the Earth

Around the Earth - Polar view

Earth fixed frame - Equatorial view, front

Earth fixed frame - Equatorial view, side

Earth fixed frame - Polar view

Earth · IRNSS-1B · IRNSS-1C · IRNSS-1E · IRNSS-1F · IRNSS-1G · IRNSS-1I

== See also ==
- Communication-Centric Intelligence Satellite (CCI-Sat)
- GPS-aided geo-augmented navigation (GAGAN)
- Satellite navigation
