= IRNSS-1B =

Indian navigation satellite

- Mission type: Navigation
- Operator: ISRO
- COSPAR ID: 2014-017A
- SATCAT no.: 39635
- Website: http://www.isro.org/pslv-c24/mission.aspx
- Mission duration: Planned: 10 years Elapsed: 11 years, 10 months, 23 days

Spacecraft properties
- Bus: I-1K
- Manufacturer: ISRO Satellite Centre; Space Applications Centre
- Launch mass: 1,432 kilograms (3,157 lb)
- Power: 1,660 watts

Start of mission
- Launch date: 4 April 2014, 11:44 UTC
- Rocket: PSLV-XL C24
- Launch site: Satish Dhawan FLP
- Contractor: ISRO

Orbital parameters
- Reference system: Geocentric
- Regime: Geosynchronous
- Longitude: 55° East
- Perigee altitude: 35,714 km (22,192 mi)
- Apogee altitude: 35,870 km (22,290 mi)
- Inclination: 30.57 degrees
- Period: 1436.010 minutes
- Epoch: 25 January 2015, 01:32:48 UTC

IRNSS-1B is the second out of seven in the Indian Regional Navigation Satellite System (IRNSS) series of satellites after IRNSS-1A. The IRNSS constellation of satellites is slated to be launched to provide navigational services to the region. It was placed in geosynchronous orbit on 4 April 2014.

== Satellite ==
The satellite will help augmenting the satellite based navigation system of India which is currently under development. The navigational system so developed will be a regional one targeted towards South Asia. The satellite will provide navigation, tracking and mapping services.

IRNSS-1B satellite has two payloads: a navigation payload and CDMA ranging payload in addition with a laser retro-reflector. The payload generates navigation signals at L5 and S-band. The design of the payload makes the IRNSS system interoperable and compatible with Global Positioning System (GPS) and Galileo. The satellite is powered by two solar arrays, which generate power up to 1,660 watts, and has a life-time of ten years.

== Launch ==
The 1,432 kg satellite was launched on 4 April 2014 at 11:44 UTC (17:14 IST) aboard the PSLV-C24 rocket from Satish Dhawan Space Centre, Sriharikota.

Animation of IRNSS

Around the Earth

Around the Earth - Polar view

Earth fixed frame - Equatorial view, front

Earth fixed frame - Equatorial view, side

Earth fixed frame - Polar view

Earth · IRNSS-1B · IRNSS-1C · IRNSS-1E · IRNSS-1F · IRNSS-1G · IRNSS-1I

== See also ==
- Communication-Centric Intelligence Satellite (CCI-Sat)
- GPS-aided geo-augmented navigation (GAGAN)
- Satellite navigation
- 2014 in spaceflight
