= Communication-Centric Intelligence Satellite =

- Mission type: Reconnaissance
- Operator: Defence Research and Development Organisation

Spacecraft properties
- Manufacturer: Defence Electronics Research Laboratory

Orbital parameters
- Reference system: Geocentric
- Apogee altitude: ~500 km (310 mi)

Communication-Centric Intelligence Satellite is an Indian advanced reconnaissance satellite, being developed by the Defence Research and Development Organisation (DRDO). It will be India's first officially declared dedicated spy satellite and is expected to be in orbit, tentatively, by 2014. This satellite will help Indian intelligence agencies to significantly boost surveillance of terror camps in neighbouring countries.

== Utilisation ==
The CCI-Sat will be able to capture images, eaves drop on communication (for example, a conversation between two satellite phones) and perform surveillance. It will be equipped with a synthetic aperture radar to take high-resolution images of target regions. The cost of the satellite is expected to be around ₹ 100 crore (around US$25 million). ISRO will contribute towards the satellite's design and development and the Defence Electronics Research Laboratory (DLRL) will be responsible for manufacturing the payload. According to DLRL Director G Boopathy, the CCI-Sat is an essential component of the initiative taken by the Government of India to further develop the electronic warfare capabilities of the Indian Army, Navy and Air Force,

== Description ==
According to Bhoopathy, the CCI-Sat would orbit Earth at an altitude of 500 km and provide surveillance and monitoring regions in proximity to India and passing on surveillance data to India intelligence agencies. Bhoopathy also added that India's defense doctrine would continue to develop assets in space and that the equipping for electronic warfare from space was a major goal of the Government of India.

== Future plans ==
This satellite will also be a test bed for future technology. Similar in line with Cartosats, the satellite can be steered up to high degrees along, as well as across, the track, with one end-objective of providing an agile platform to field cutting edge technology developed from previous experience gained by India's extensive remote sensing and TES satellite programs.

== See also ==
- RISAT-2
- Cartosat-2
- Cartosat-2A
- Cartosat-2B
- Cartosat-3
- Technology Experiment Satellite
- List of Indian satellites
