= IRNSS-1A =

Indian navigation satellite

- Mission type: Navigation
- Operator: ISRO
- COSPAR ID: 2013-034A
- SATCAT no.: 39199
- Mission duration: Planned: 10 years Elapsed: 13 years, 2 months, 25 days

Spacecraft properties
- Bus: I-1K
- Manufacturer: ISRO Satellite Centre; Space Applications Centre
- Launch mass: 1,425 kilograms (3,142 lb)
- Dry mass: 614 kilograms (1,354 lb)
- Power: 1,660 watts

Start of mission
- Launch date: 1 July 2013, 18:11 UTC
- Rocket: PSLV-XL C22
- Launch site: Satish Dhawan FLP
- Contractor: ISRO

Orbital parameters
- Reference system: Geocentric
- Regime: Geosynchronous
- Longitude: 55° E
- Perigee altitude: 35,706.1 km (22,186.7 mi)
- Apogee altitude: 35,882.7 km (22,296.5 mi)
- Inclination: 29.3°
- Period: 1436.1 minutes
- Epoch: 22 January 2015, 16:27:41 UTC

IRNSS-1A is the first navigational satellite in the Indian Regional Navigation Satellite System (IRNSS) series of satellites been placed in geosynchronous orbit.

== Satellite ==
The satellite has been developed at a cost of ₹1.25 billion (US$13 million), and was launched on 1 July 2013. It will provide IRNSS services to the Indian public, which would be a system similar to Global Positioning System (GPS) but only for India and the region around it.

Each IRNSS satellite has two payloads: a navigation payload and CDMA ranging payload in addition with a laser retro-reflector. The payload generates navigation signals at L5 and S-band. The design of the payload makes the IRNSS system inter-operable and compatible with GPS and Galileo. The satellite is powered by two solar arrays, which generate power up to 1,660 watts, and has a lifetime of ten years.

== Launch ==
The satellite was launched from the Satish Dhawan Space Centre (SDSC) on 1 July 2013 at 11:41 PM (IST). The launch was postponed from its initial launch date of 26 June 2013 due to a technical snag in the 2nd stage of the PSLV-C22 launch rocket. ISRO then replaced the faulty component in the rocket and rescheduled the launch to 1 July 2013 at 11:43 p.m.

Scientists from the German Aerospace Centre (DLR)'s Institute of Communications and Navigation in Oberpfaffenhofen, Germany, have received signals from IRNSS-1A. On 23 July 2013, the German Aerospace Center scientists pointed their 30-meter dish antenna at Weilheim towards the satellite and found that it was already transmitting a signal in the L5 frequency band.

== Partial Failure ==
The three Rubidium atomic clocks on-board IRNSS-1A failed, with the first failure occurring in July 2016. ISRO planned to replace it with IRNSS-1H, in August 2017, but this failed to separate from the launch vehicle. On 12 April 2018, ISRO launched successfully IRNSS-1I as a replacement for IRNSS-1A.

The cause of failure was traced to one of the feed through capacitor carrying the DC supply to the physics package of clock, malfunctioning due to excessive rise in temperature. IRNSS-1A and IRNSS-1G are now being used only for NavIC's short message broadcast service.

== See also ==
- Communication-Centric Intelligence Satellite (CCI-Sat)
- GPS-aided geo-augmented navigation (GAGAN)
- Satellite navigation
