= List of GSLV launches =

Launches made by the Geosynchronous Satellite Launch Vehicle Mk I and Mk II

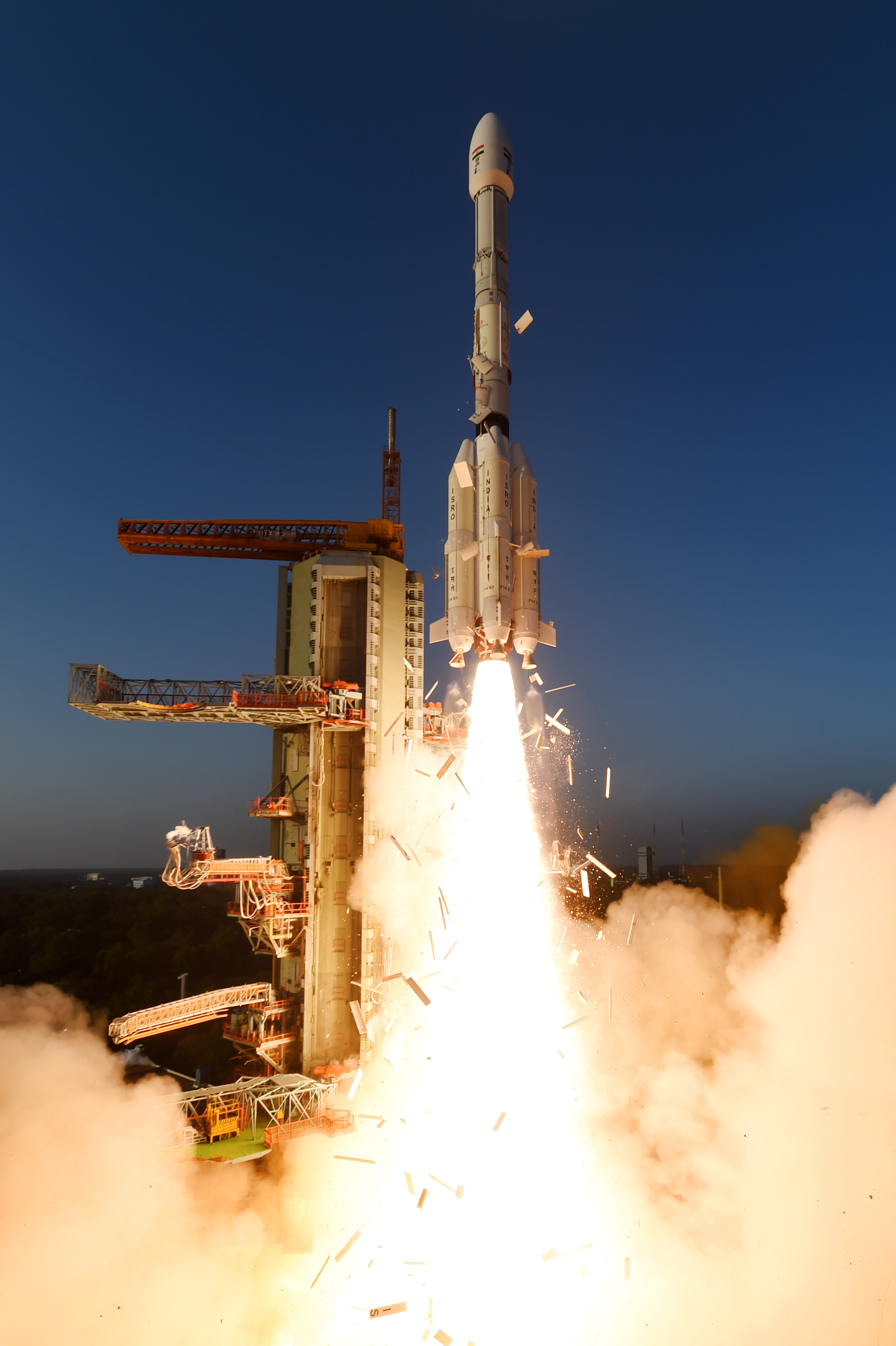
Liftoff of GSLV Mk. II F14 from SDSC SLP, carrying INSAT-3DS.

This is a list of launches conducted by ISRO using Geosynchronous Satellite Launch Vehicle (GSLV) rockets. This list does not include LVM3 (formerly known as GSLV Mk III) launches, which can be found here.

== Notable missions ==
=== GSLV MK. I flight D1 ===
This was the first developmental flight of the GSLV Mk.I featuring Russian cryogenic engine KVD-1. It was used to place an experimental satellite GSAT-1 into the orbit. However, due to sub-optimal performance and lack of fuel the vehicle did not achieve the intended orbit and the satellite had to maneuver itself using onboard fuel to correct the shortfall. ISRO claims the launch to be successful. In a 2014 interview, ISRO Chairman K. Radhakrishnan attributed the failure to incorrect mixture ratio used in the cryogenic upper stage.

=== GSLV MK. II flight D5 ===
This was the second test flight with indigenous cryogenic stage CE-7.5 and the first successful launch with the CE-7.5. The flight lifted and successfully placed the 1,982 kilograms (4,370 lb) GSAT-14 into the orbit. This flight became the harbinger of successful launch with the indigenous cryogenic stage.

=== GSLV MK. II flight F09 ===
This was the fourth consecutive successful flight of GSLV Mk. II with indigenous cryogenic engine. The flight placed the regional satellite South Asia Satellite was previously named as South Asian Association for Regional Cooperation (SAARC) Satellite. The satellite was a gift from India to its neighbors to bolster Prime Minister Narendra Modi's neighborhood first policy. Afghanistan, Bangladesh, Bhutan, Maldives, Nepal and Sri Lanka are the users of the multi-dimensional facilities provided by the satellite.

== Statistics ==
=== Rocket configurations ===
- GSLV MK. I
- GSLV MK. II

=== Launch sites ===
- First LP
- Second LP

=== Mission outcome ===
- Success
- Partial failure
- Failure
- Planned

== Launch history ==
As of 30 October 2026, rockets from the GSLV family have made 20 launches, resulting in 14 successes, four failures, and two partial failures. All launches have occurred from the Satish Dhawan Space Centre, known before 2002 as the Sriharikota Range (SHAR).

=== 2001–2009 ===
Flight No.	Date / time (UTC)	Rocket, Configuration	Launch site	Payload	Payload mass	Orbit	User	Launch outcome
D1	18 April 2001; 10:13	Mk I	First	(India) GSAT-1	1540 kg	GTO	INSAT	Partial failure
D1	Developmental flight, payload placed into lower than planned orbit, and did not have sufficient fuel to reach a usable orbit.							
D2	8 May 2003; 11:28	Mk I	First	(India) GSAT-2	1825 kg	GTO	INSAT	Success
D2	Developmental flight.							
F01	20 September 2004; 10:31	Mk I	First	(India) GSAT-3	1950 kg	GTO	INSAT	Success
F01	First operational flight.							
F02	10 July 2006; 12:08	Mk I	Second	(India) INSAT-4C	2168 kg	GTO	INSAT	Failure
F02	One of the L40 strap-on engines failed at lift-off. Both rocket and satellite had to be destroyed over the Bay of Bengal after the rocket's trajectory veered outside permitted limits.							
F04	2 September 2007; 12:51	Mk I	Second	(India) INSAT-4CR	2160 kg	GTO	INSAT	Partial failure
F04	High roll rate build-up due control system malfunction on one L40 strapon resulted in premature shutdown of other strap-on stages. Due to an error in the guidance subsystem achieved orbit had lower apogee and inclination higher than expected. Orbit corrected through satellite, eventually the INSAT-4CR was placed in its slot. Satellite achieved a life of 13 years, 3 months against a planned design life of 12 years. ISRO categorizes this GSLV flight as successful.							
=== 2010–2017 ===
Flight No.	Date / time (UTC)	Rocket, Configuration	Launch site	Payload	Payload mass	Orbit	User	Launch outcome
D3	15 April 2010; 10:57	Mk II	Second	(India) GSAT-4	2220 kg	GTO	INSAT	Failure
D3	First flight test of the ISRO designed and built Cryogenic Upper Stage (CUS). Failed to reach orbit due to malfunction of the Fuel Booster Turbo Pump (FBTP) of the cryogenic upper stage.							
F06	25 December 2010; 10:34	Mk I	Second	(India) GSAT-5P	2310 kg	GTO	INSAT	Failure
F06	First flight of GSLV Mk.I (c). Aft shroud of upper stage engine bay disintegrated due to aerodynamic loads, snapping the electrical continuity to L40 strapons. Vehicle was destroyed by range safety officer after loss of control over liquid-fueled boosters.							
D5	5 January 2014; 10:48	Mk II	Second	(India) GSAT-14	1980 kg	GTO	INSAT	Success
D5	The flight was scheduled for 19 August 2013, but one hour and 14 minutes before the lift off, a leakage was reported and the launch was halted. Second flight of GSLV with indigenous cryogenic upper stage (CUS) developed by ISRO's Liquid Propulsion Systems Centre (LPSC) was launched successfully on 5 January 2014. It was a launch with precision of 40 m (130 ft). All the three stages performed successfully. This was the first successful flight of the cryogenic stage which was developed indigenously in India.							
D6	27 August 2015; 11:22	Mk II	Second	(India) GSAT-6	2117 kg	GTO	INSAT	Success
D6	GSLV Mk II D6 with an Indigenous Cryogenic Engine (ICE) successfully ferried GSAT-6 payload into Geostationary Transfer Orbit (GTO) with injection parameters of 170 km x 35945 km, 19.96° inclination. The cuboid-shaped GSAT-6 satellite includes a technology demonstrator S-Band unfurlable antenna with a diameter of six metre which will provide S-band communication services during its expected mission life of nine years.							
F05	8 September 2016; 11:20	MK II	Second	(India) INSAT-3DR	2211 kg	GTO	INSAT	Success
F05	First operational flight of GSLV Mk II. The injection parameters were met with extreme precision. Perigee was within 300m (within 0.18%) of the expected value whereas apogee was within 0.2% (80 km). The difference between expected and actual inclination degree was 0. INSAT-3DR is an advanced atmospheric weather satellite. as well as the second heaviest satellite placed in orbit by an indigenous cryogenic engine propelled GSLV							
F09	5 May 2017; 11:27	Mk II	Second	(India) GSAT-9 / South Asia Satellite	2230 kg	GTO	INSAT	Success
F09	South Asia Satellite was previously named as South Asian Association for Regional Cooperation (SAARC) Satellite.							
=== 2018 ===
Flight No.	Date / time (UTC)	Rocket, Configuration	Launch site	Payload	Payload mass	Orbit	User	Launch Outcome
F08	29 March 2018; 11:26	Mk II	Second	(India) GSAT-6A	2140 kg	GTO	INSAT	Success
F08	Used an enhanced version of the Vikas engine called High Thrust Vikas Engine (HTVE) which had a thrust of 848 kN (191,000 lb_{f}) in GS2 stage. Electro-hydraulic Actuation used for gimballing in GS2 stage was replaced by more reliable Electro-Mechanical Actuation.							
F11	19 December 2018; 10:40	Mk II	Second	(India) GSAT-7A	2250 kg	GTO	INSAT	Success
F11	Used an enhanced version of the Vikas engine called High Thrust Vikas Engine (HTVE) along with uprated cryogenic engine C15.							
=== 2021 ===
Flight No.	Date / time (UTC)	Rocket, Configuration	Launch site	Payload	Payload mass	Orbit	User	Launch Outcome
F10	12 August 2021; 00:13	Mk II	Second	(India) GISAT-1 / EOS-03	2268 kg	GTO	ISRO	Failure
F10	Carried EOS-03, a geostationary multi-spectral imaging satellite. The third stage failed to ignite, leading to the loss of the mission. A lower than normal LH2 tank pressure in the cryogenic stage at the time of ignition of the engine resulted in anomalous operation of the Fuel Booster Turbo Pump (FBTP) mounted inside the LH2 tank which feeds the main turbopump of the engine. This in-turn resulted in insufficient flow of Liquid Hydrogen into the engine thrust chamber. The most likely reason for the observed reduction in LH2 tank pressure was a leak in the respective Vent and Relief Valve (VRV), which is used for relieving excess tank pressure during flight.							
=== 2023 ===
Flight No.	Date / time (UTC)	Rocket, Configuration	Launch site	Payload	Payload mass	Orbit	User	Launch Outcome
F12	29 May 2023; 10:42	Mk II	Second	(India) NVS-01	2232 kg	GTO	ISRO	Success
F12	NVS-01 is the first in the second generation navigational satellites. It carried navigational payload operating in L1, L5 and s bands. For the first time, an indigenous atomic clock was flown in NVS-01.							
=== 2024 ===
Flight No.	Date / time (UTC)	Rocket, Configuration	Launch site	Payload	Payload mass	Orbit	User	Launch Outcome
F14	17 February 2024; 12:05	Mk II	Second	(India) INSAT-3DS	2275 kg	GTO	ISRO	Success
F14	Follow on mission to INSAT-3DR. In this mission, a new white coloured C15 stage was introduced which has more environmental-friendly manufacturing processes, better insulation properties and the use of lightweight materials.							
=== 2025 ===
Flight No.	Date / time (UTC)	Rocket, Configuration	Launch site	Payload	Payload mass	Orbit	User	Launch Outcome
F15	29 January 2025; 00:53	Mk II	Second	(India) NVS-02 (IRNSS-1K)	2250 kg	GTO	ISRO	Success
F15	Second generation NAVIC satellite. Also known IRNSS-1K.							
F16	30 July 2025; 12:10	Mk II	Second	(United States) (India) NISAR	2393 kg	SSO	NASA / ISRO	Success
F16	A NASA - ISRO joint mission to co-develop and launch a dual-frequency synthetic aperture radar on an Earth observation satellite.							
=== 2026 ===
F17	3 September 2026; 21:25	Mk II	Second	(India) EOS-05 (GISAT-1A)	2367 kg	GTO	ISRO	Success
F17	Replacement satellite for EOS-03 which failed to reached orbit on GSLV F10. EOS-05 was successfully placed into a sub-geosynchronous transfer orbit of ~171 km perigee and ~31000km apogee by GSLV F17. Apogee attained was ~2000km higher than intended due to higher than expected delta-v given by GSLV launch vehicle.							
F18	30 October 2026 18:21	Mk II	Second	(India) NVS-03	2250 kg	GTO	ISRO	Success
F18	NVS-03 navigation satellite was successfully placed into a geosynchronous transfer orbit of 170.3 km perigee and 38080 km apogee by GSLV F18. Apogee attained was 1000 km higher than intended due to excess performance given by GSLV launch vehicle.							

== Future launches ==
Date / time (UTC)	Flight No.	Rocket, Configuration	Launch site	Payload	Orbit	User
2027	GSLV F19	Mk II	Second	(India) NVS-04	GTO	ISRO
2027	Second generation NAVIC satellite. Also known as IRNSS-1M.					
2027	GSLV F20	Mk II	Second	(India) IDRSS-1 (CMS-04)	GTO	ISRO
2027	GSLV F21	Mk II	Second	(India) NVS-05	GTO	ISRO
2027	Second generation NAVIC satellite. Also known as IRNSS-1N.					
2027	GSLV F22	Mk II	Second	(India) IDRSS-2	GTO	ISRO
TBA	-	GEV	Second	(India) RLV-ORV	LEO	ISRO
TBA	Orbital Reentry Experiment (OREX) of RLV-TD will use the existing GSLV launch vehicle with PS-4 stage instead of its CUS upper stages (due to decreased performance unlike a regular GSLV launch) and Orbital Re-entry vehicle (ORV) in place of its ogive payload fairing.					

== Gallery ==
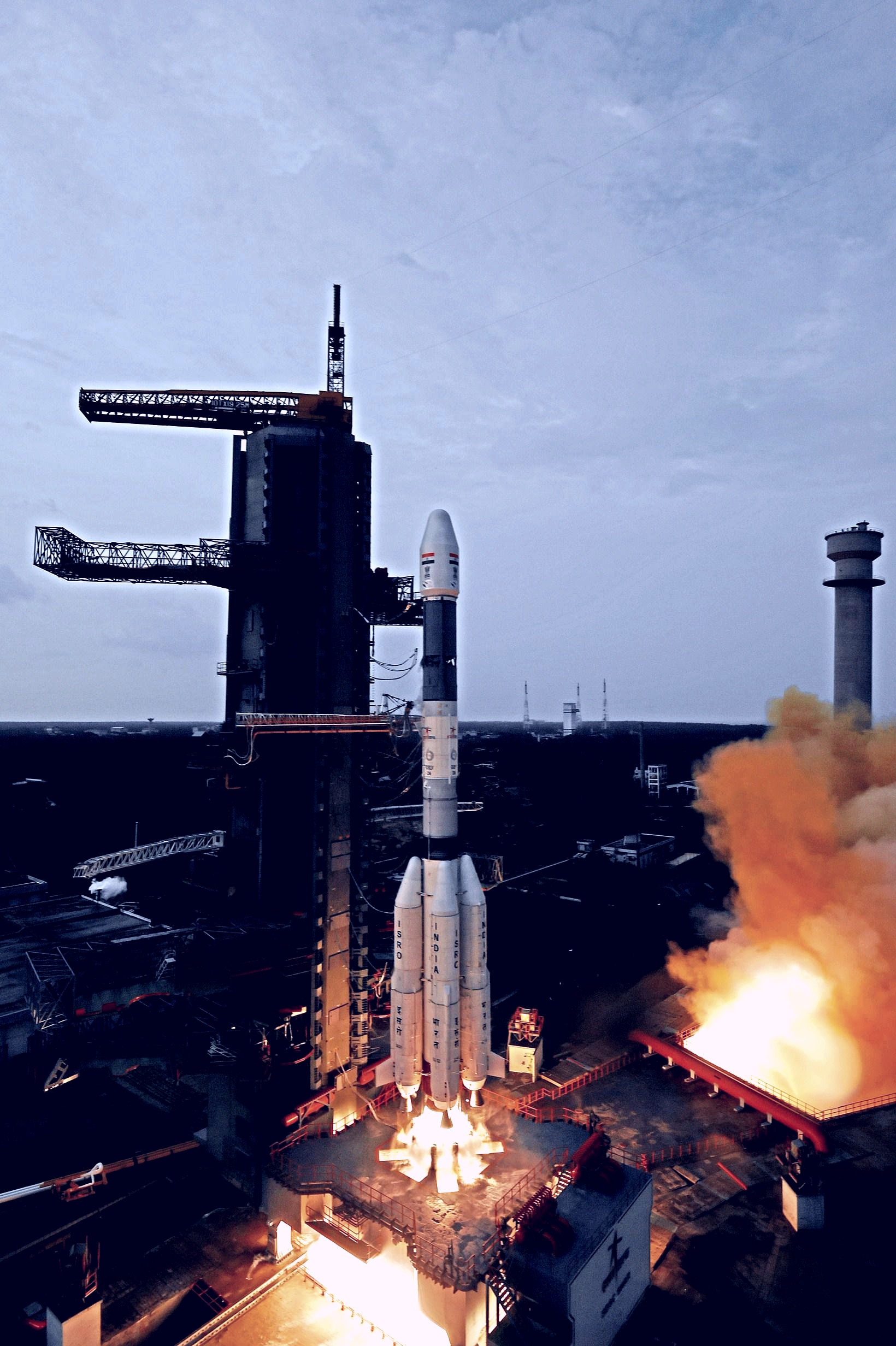
GSAT-6 launch

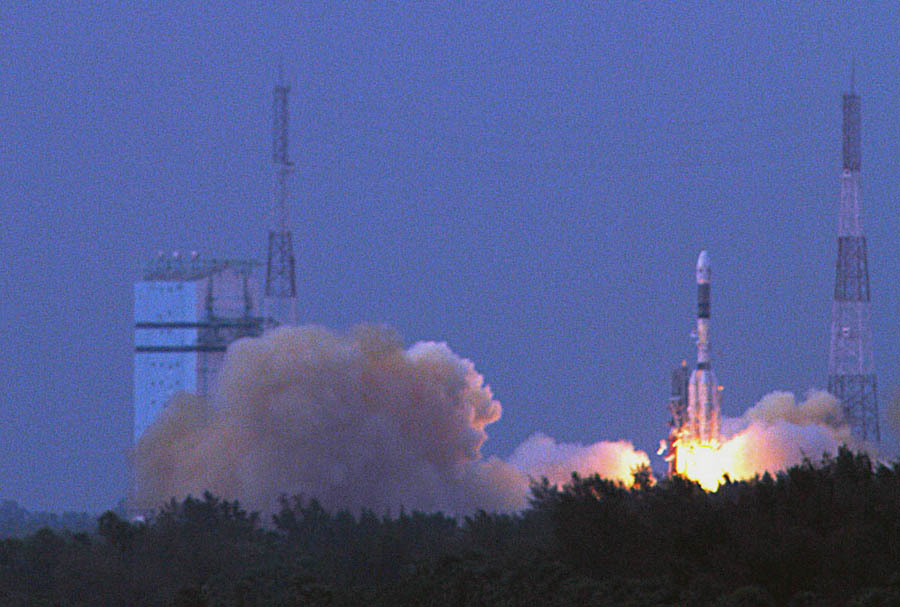
EDUSAT launch

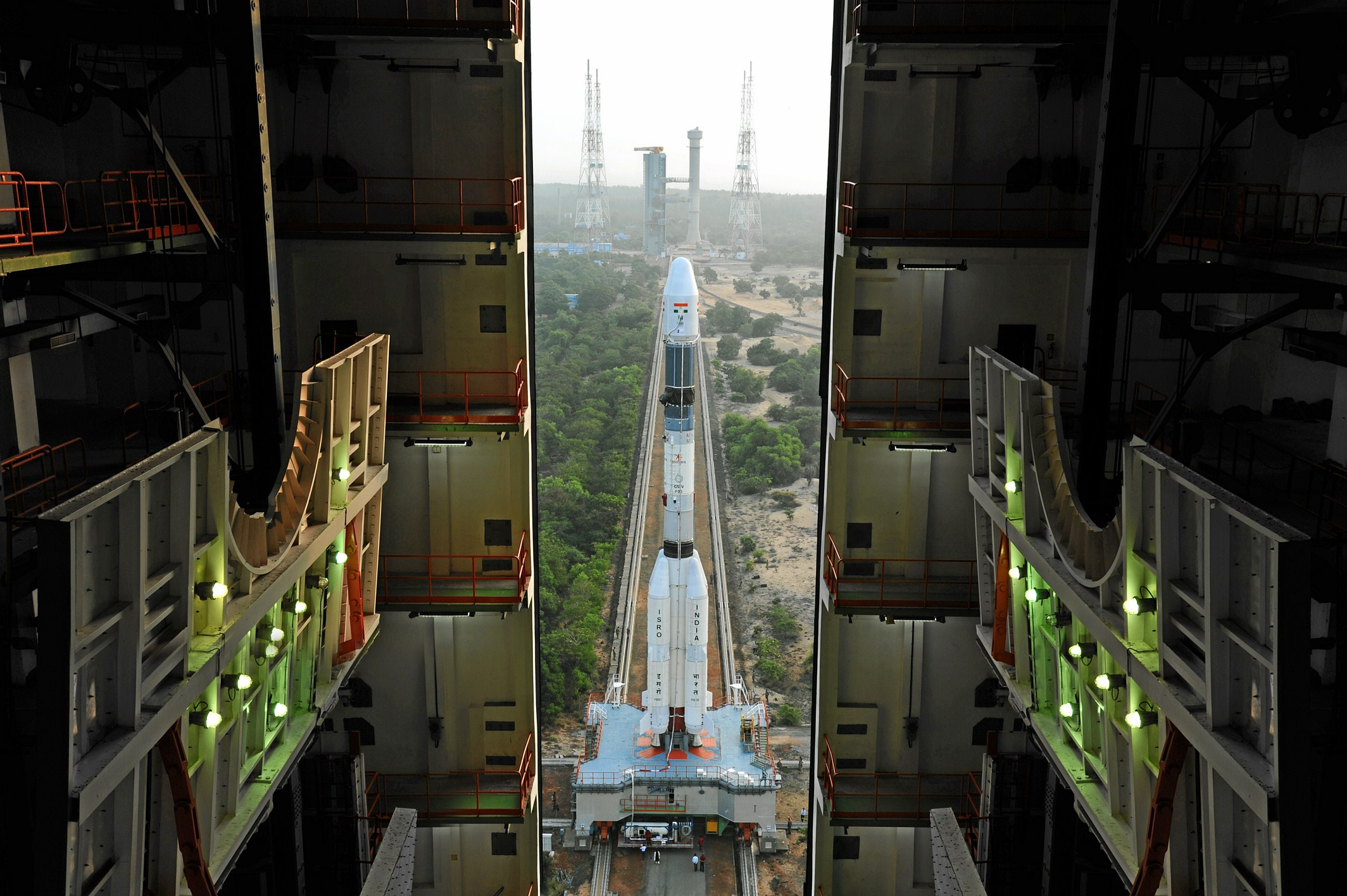
Fully integrated GSLV-F05 coming out of the Vehicle Assembly Building.

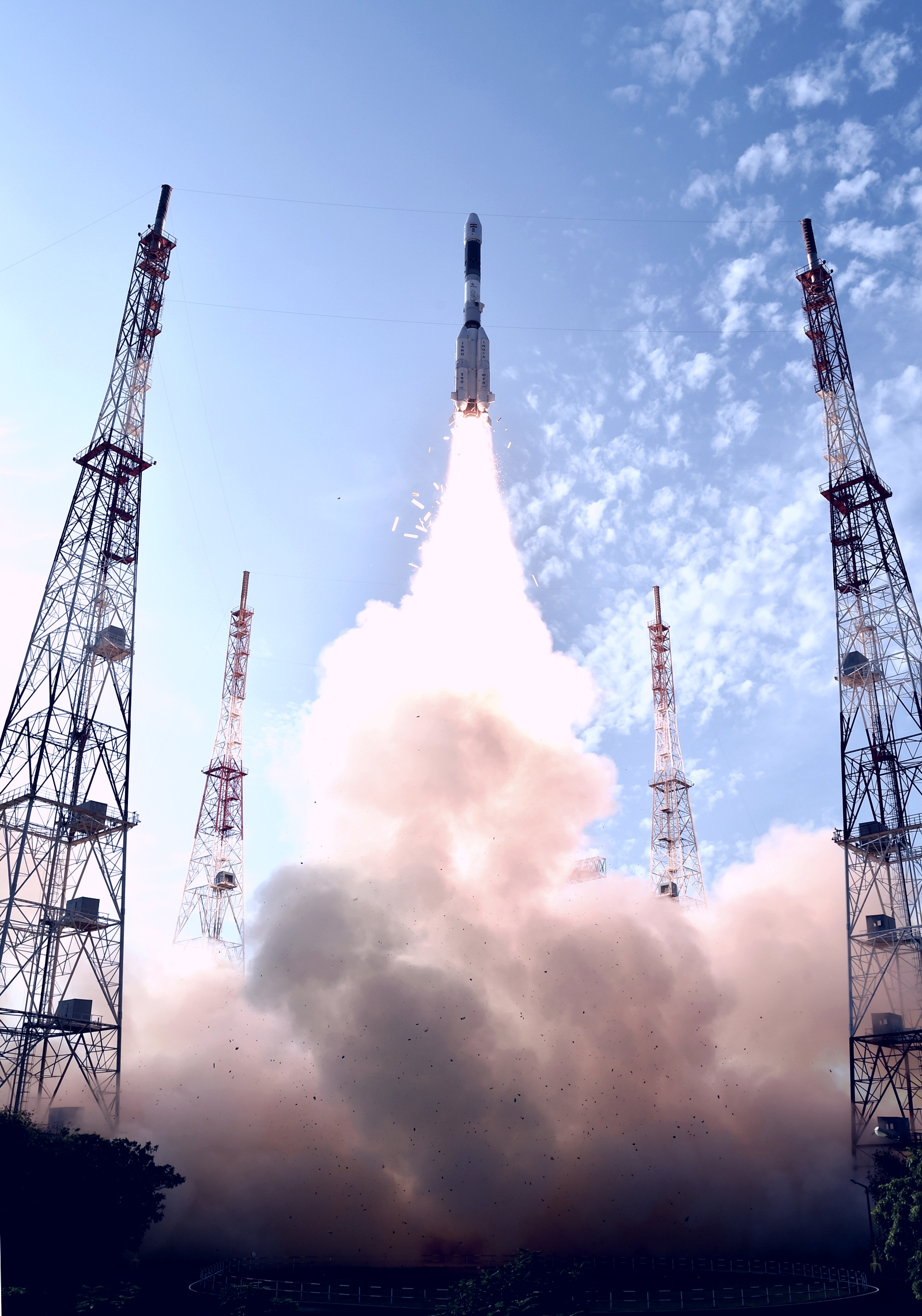
INSAT-3DR launch

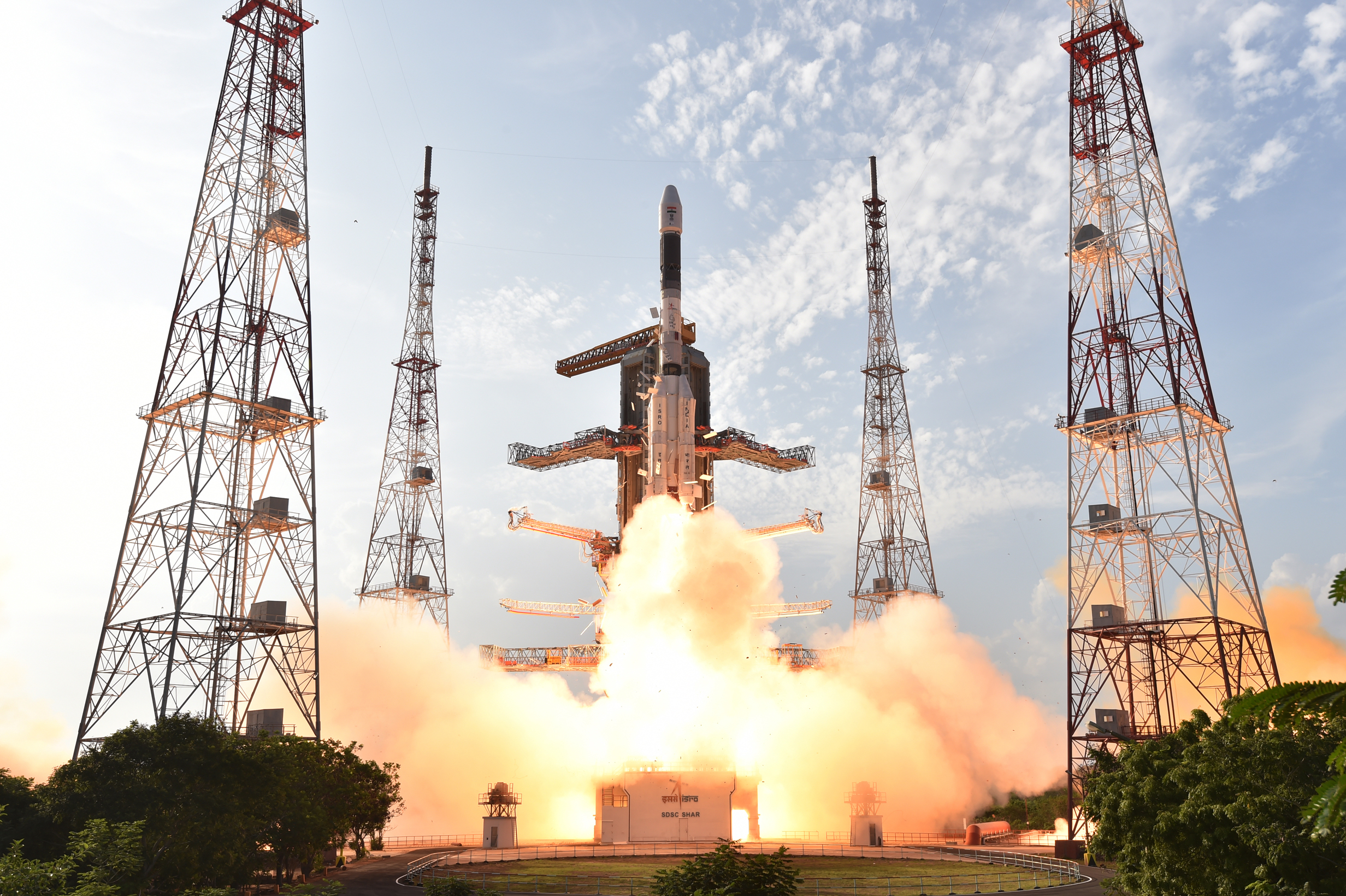
GSLV F05 take off

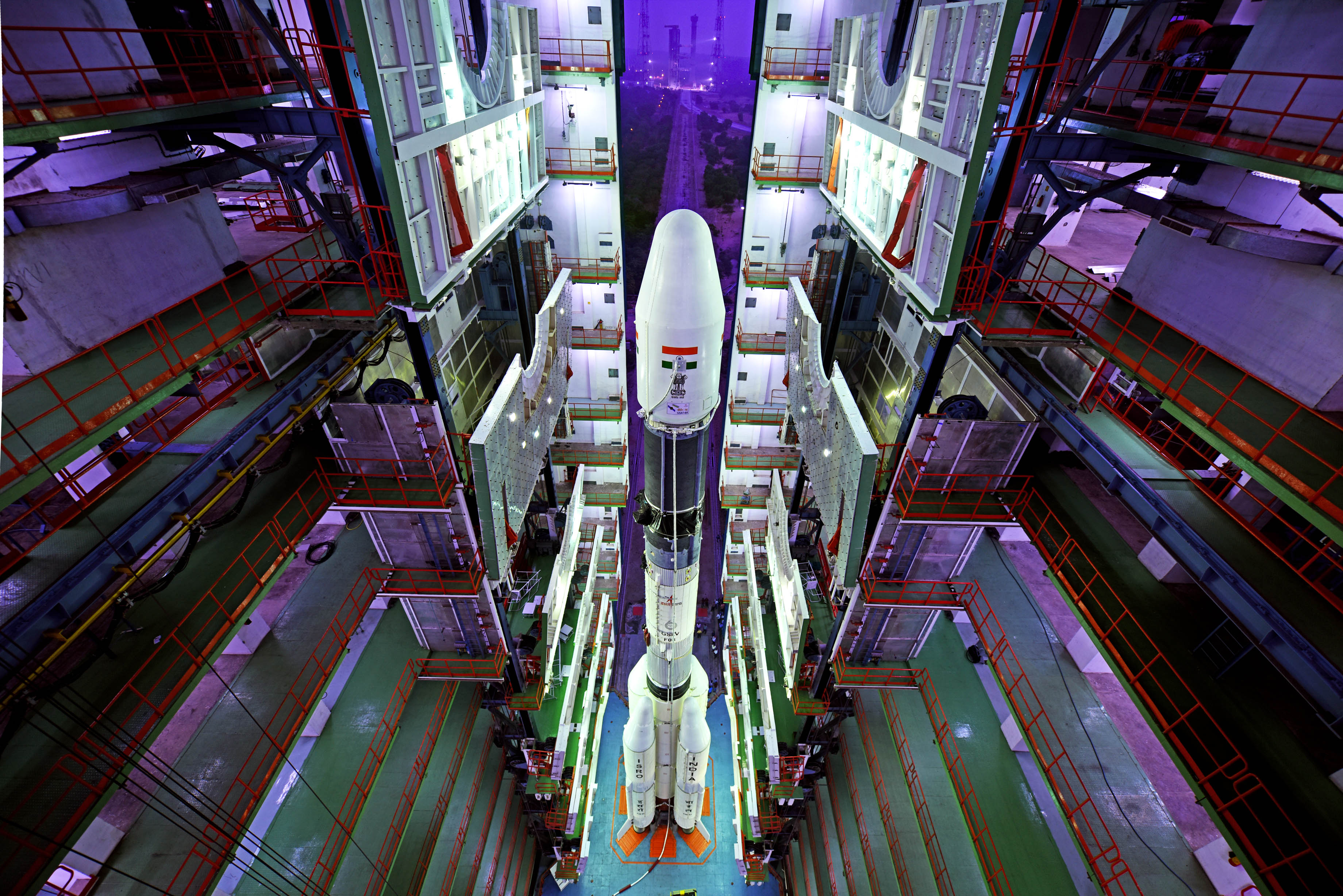
Top view of a fully Integrated GSLV-F08 inside the Vehicle Assembly Building.

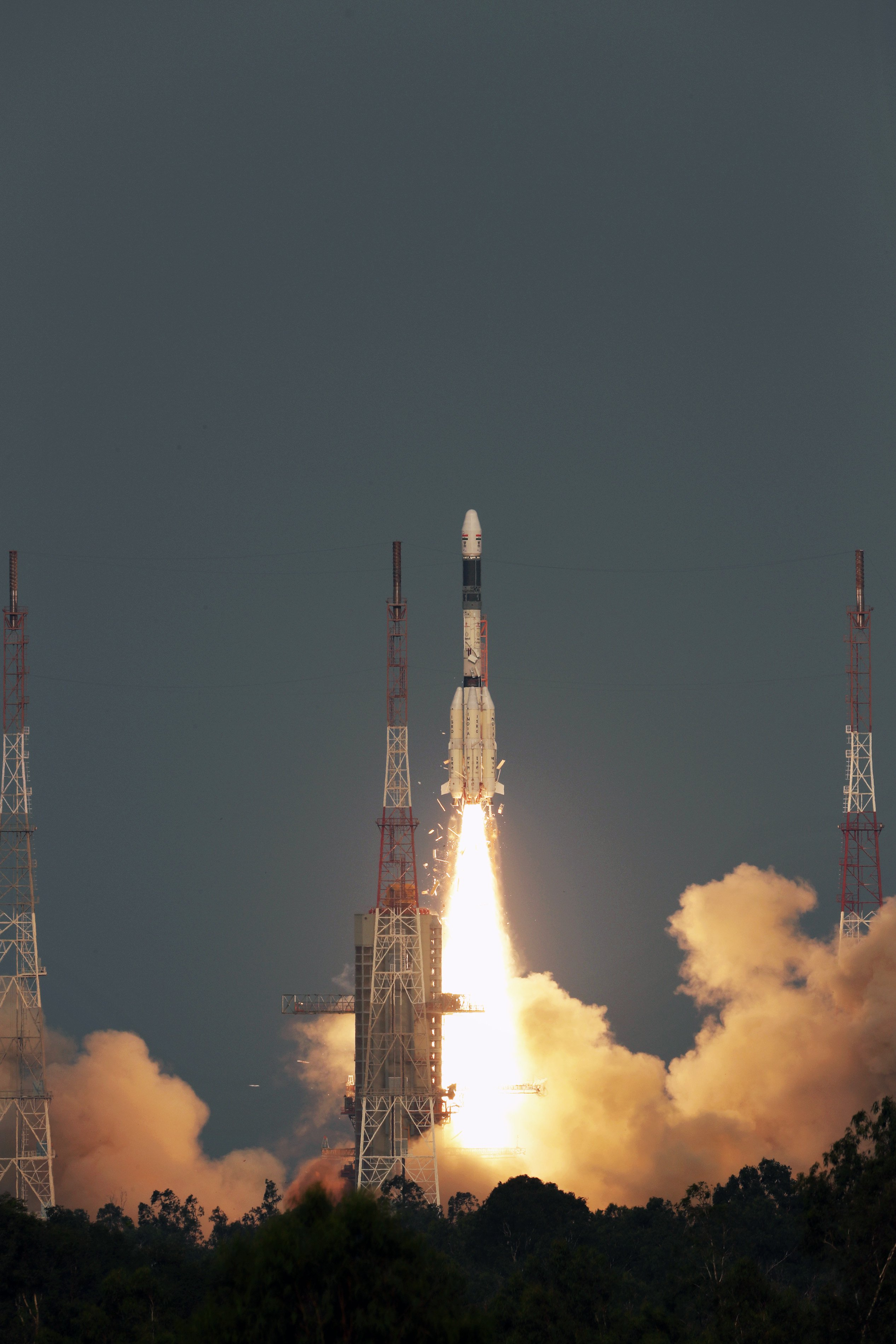
GSLV F08 lift off.

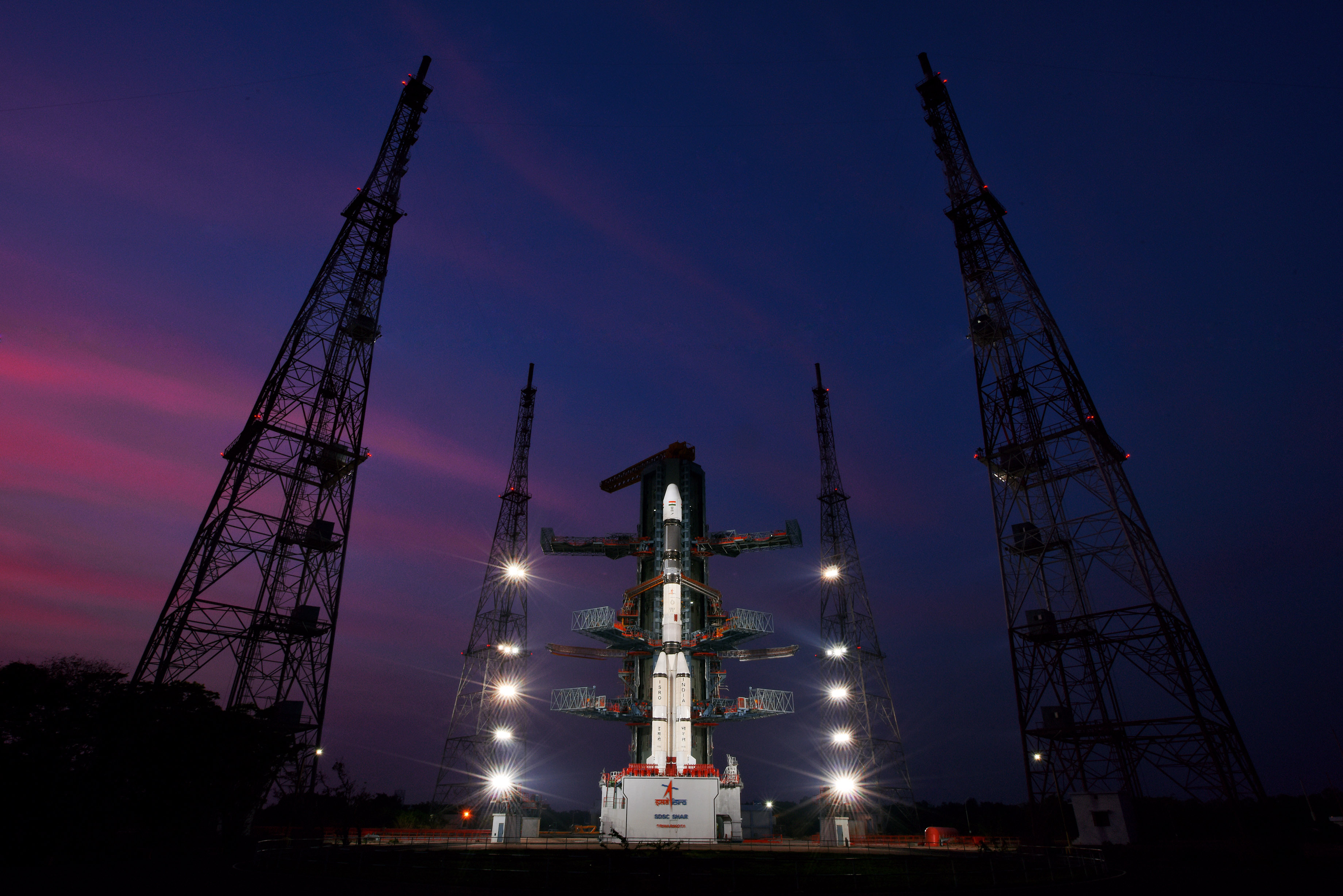
GSLV F11 vehicle at Second Launch Pad.

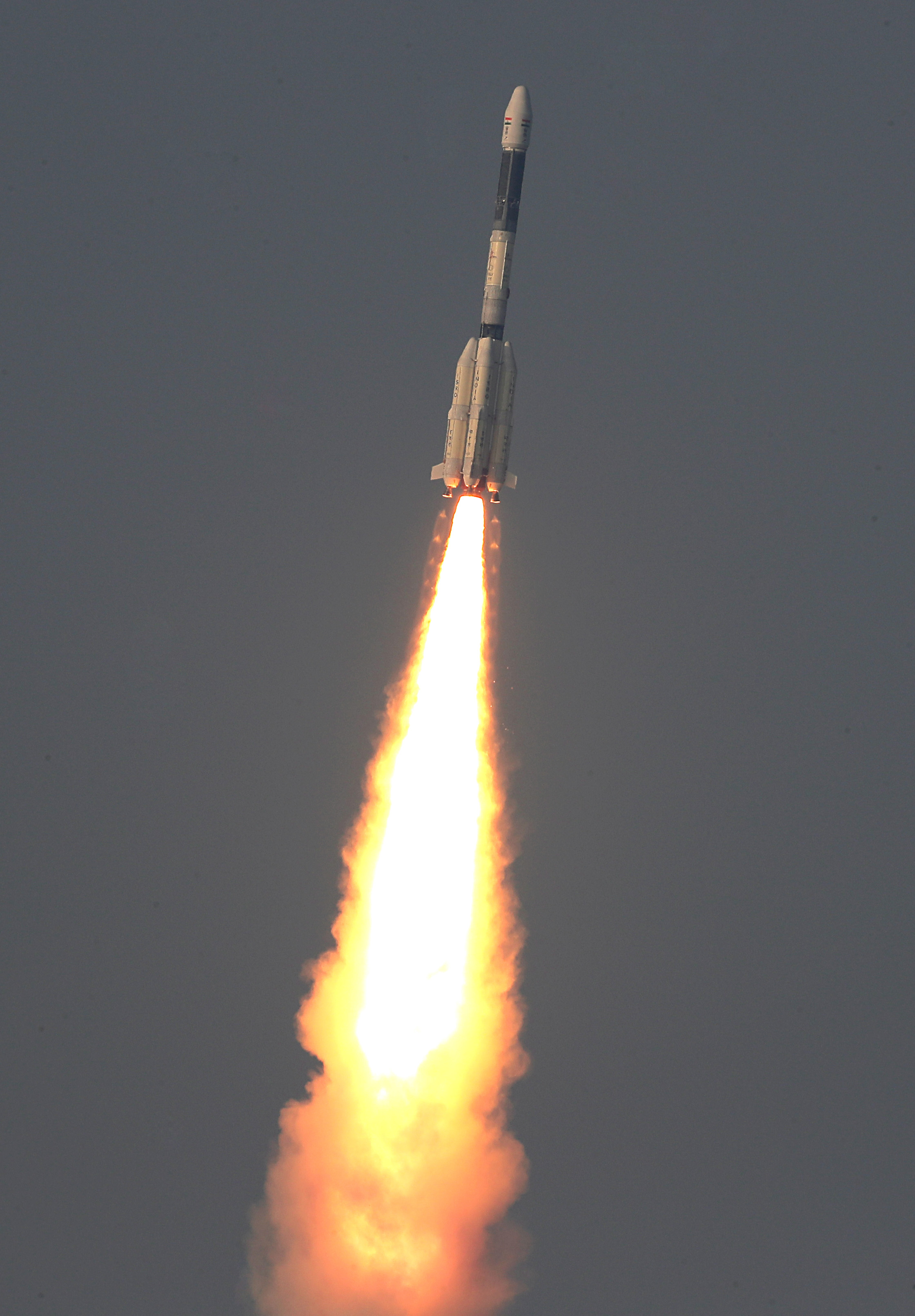
GSAT-7A launch

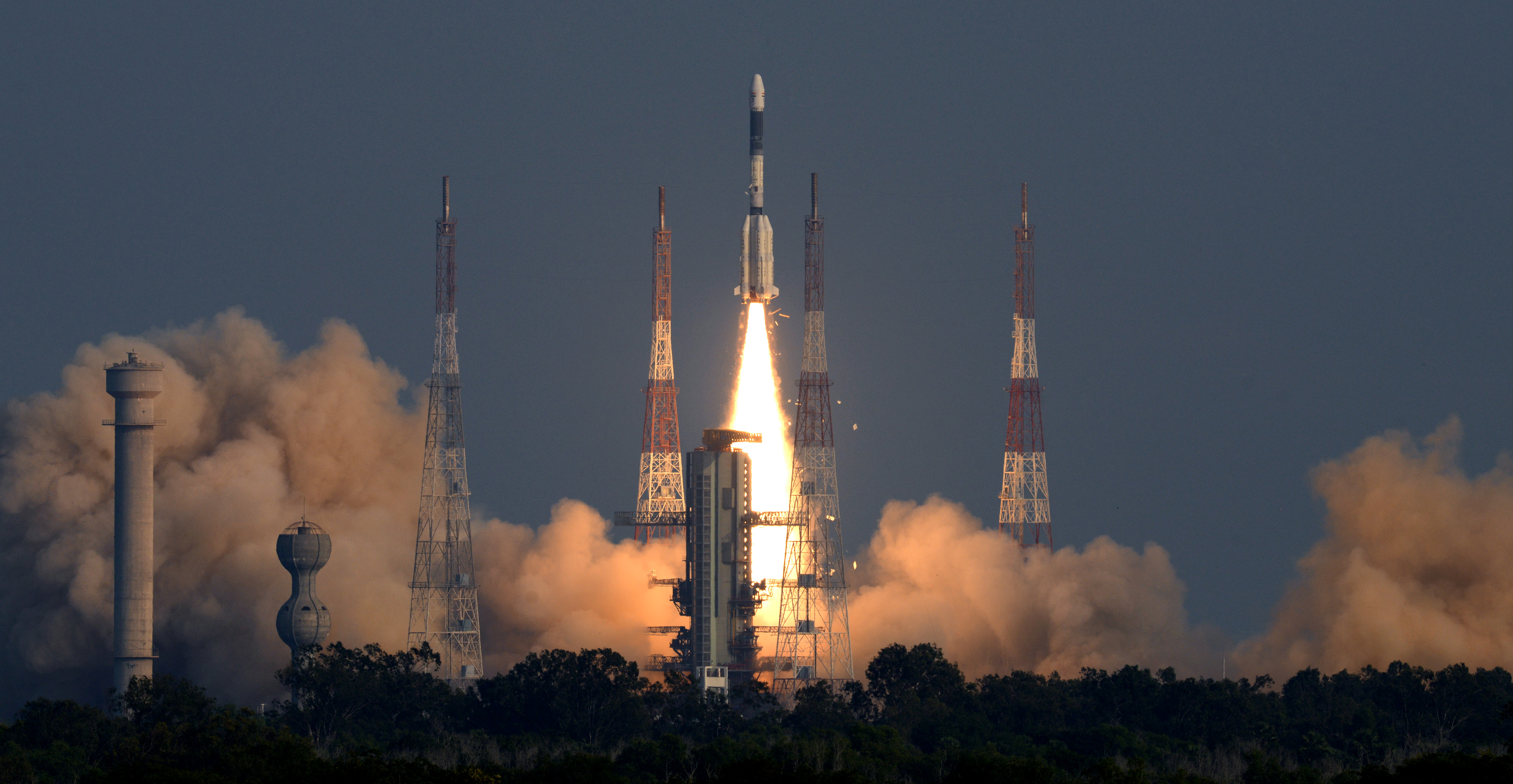
Launch of GSLV F11 from Second Launch Pad.

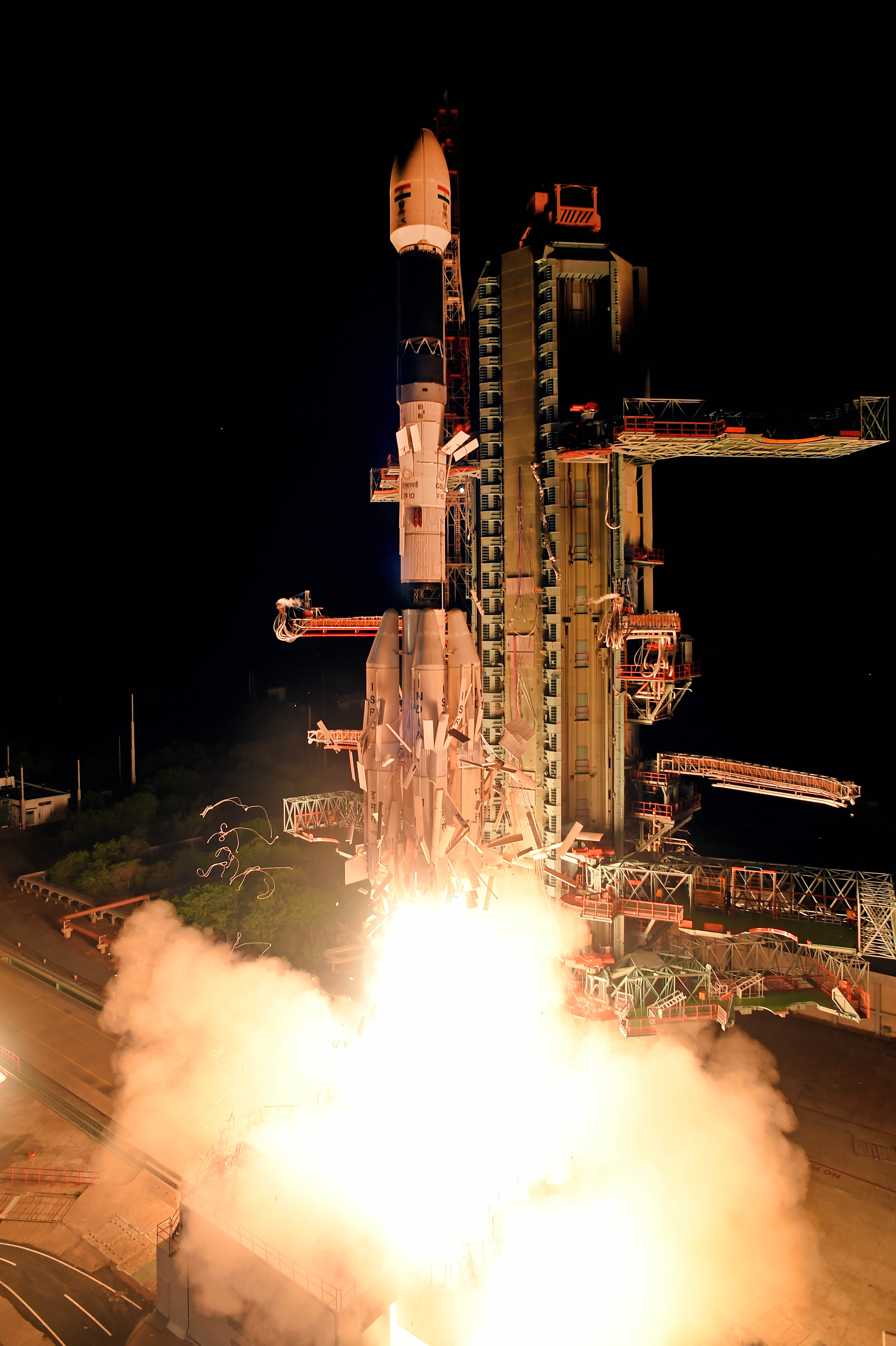
EOS-03 launch

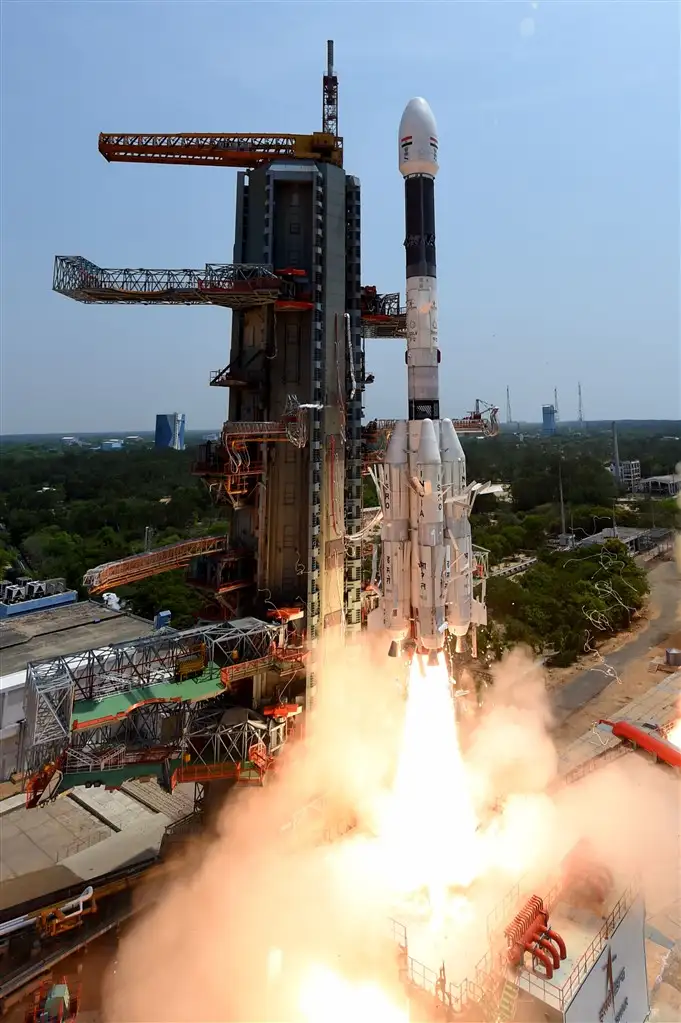
NVS-01 launch

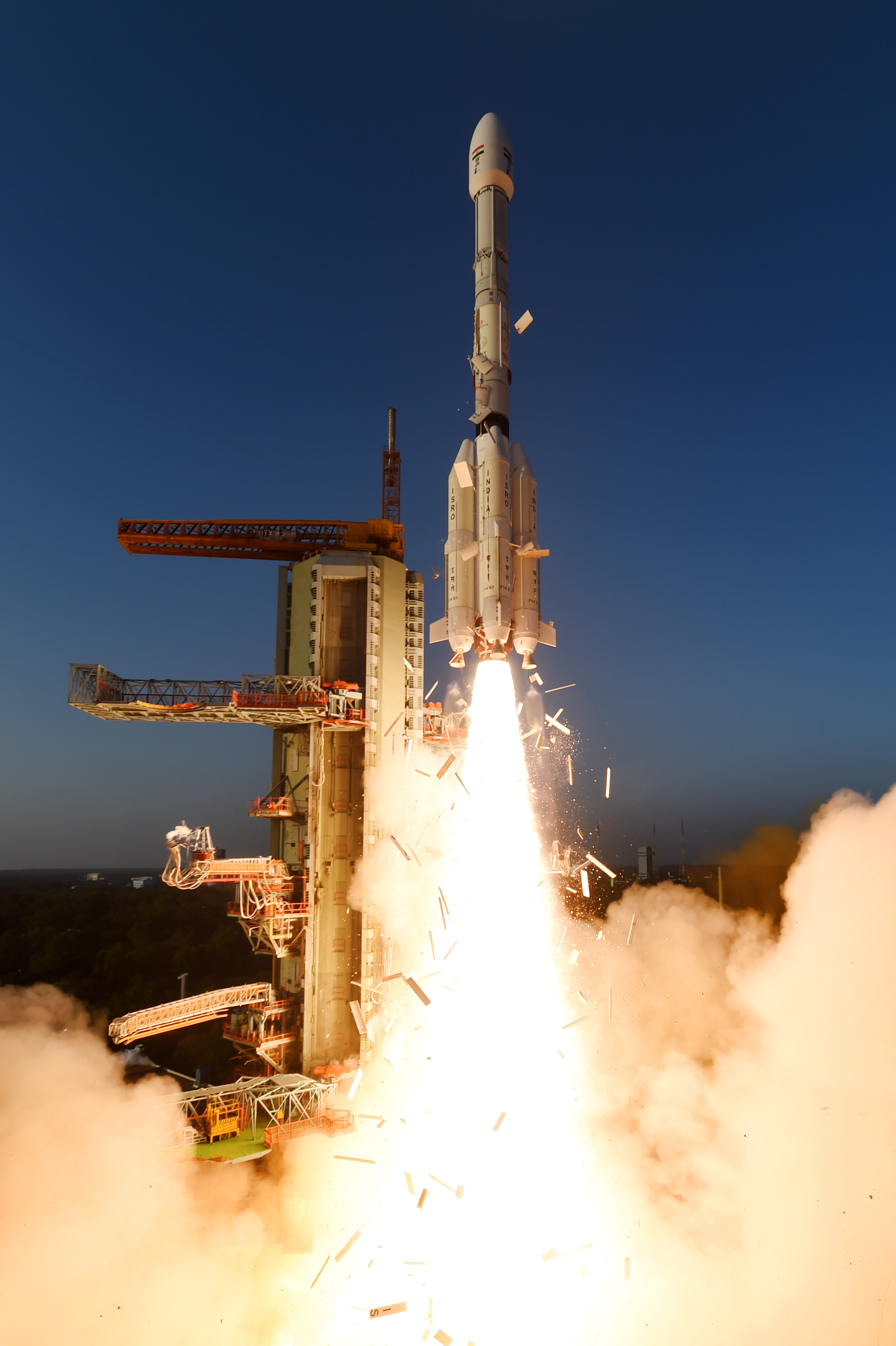
INSAT-3DS launch

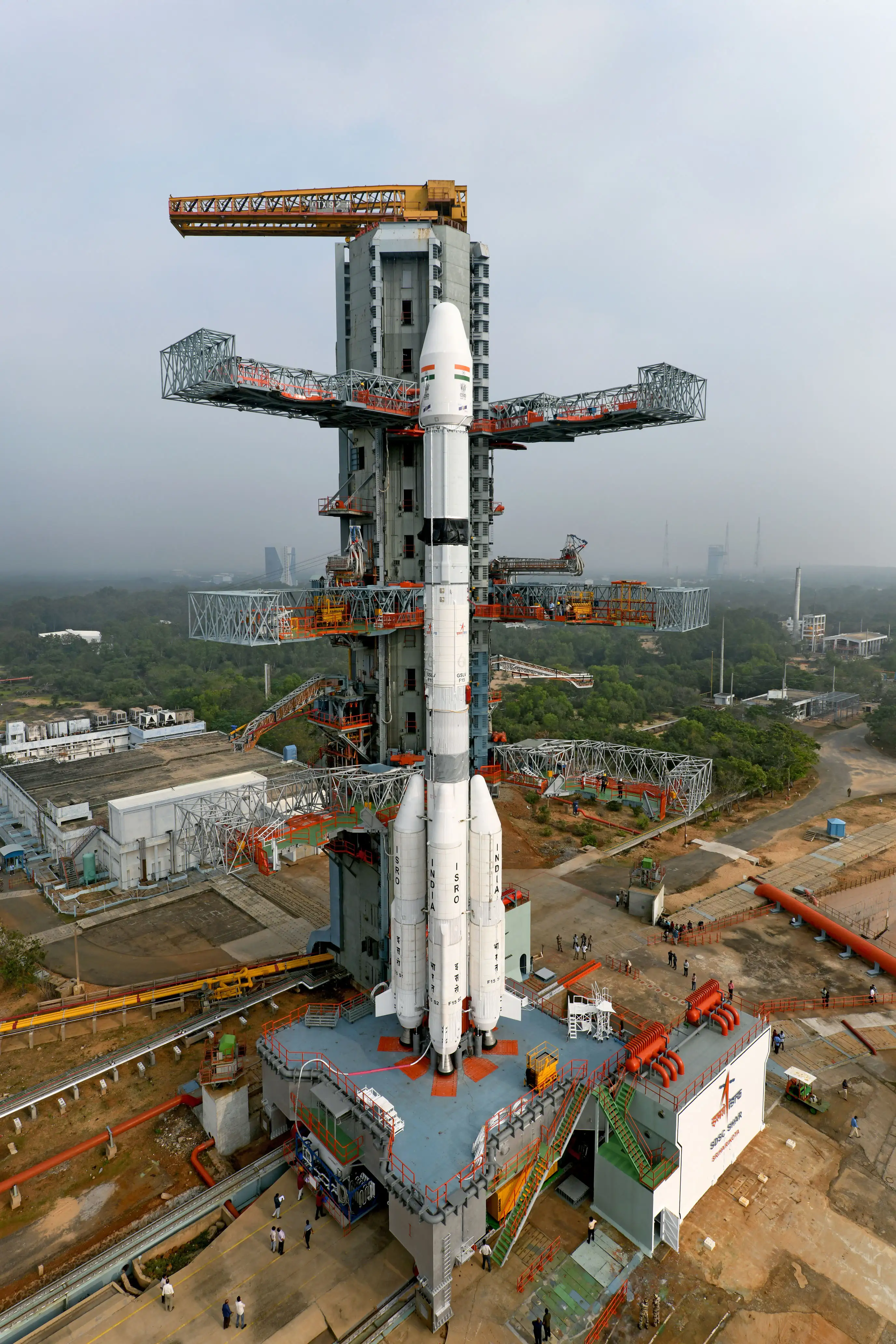
NVS-02 at SLP before launch

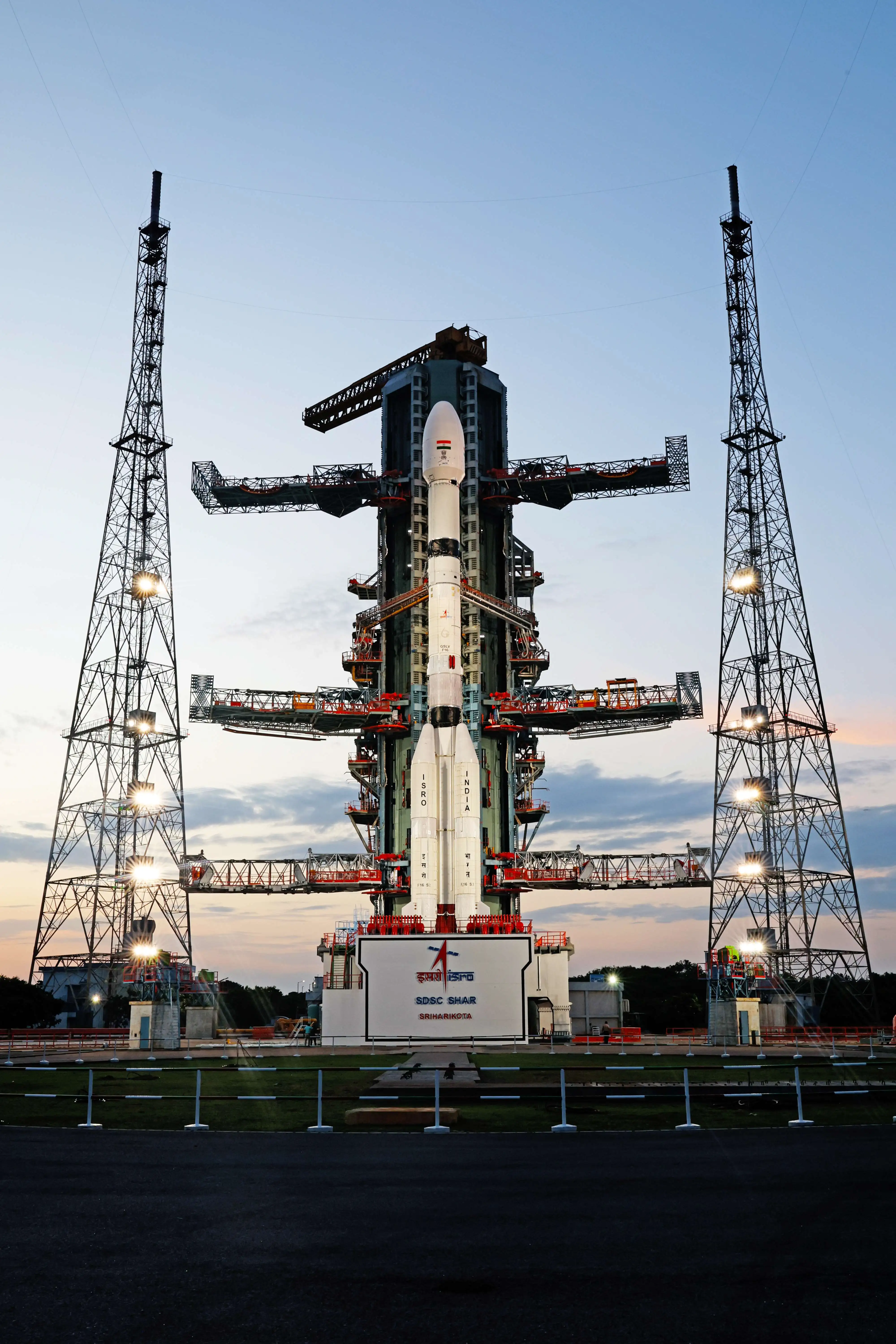
NISAR at SLP before launch

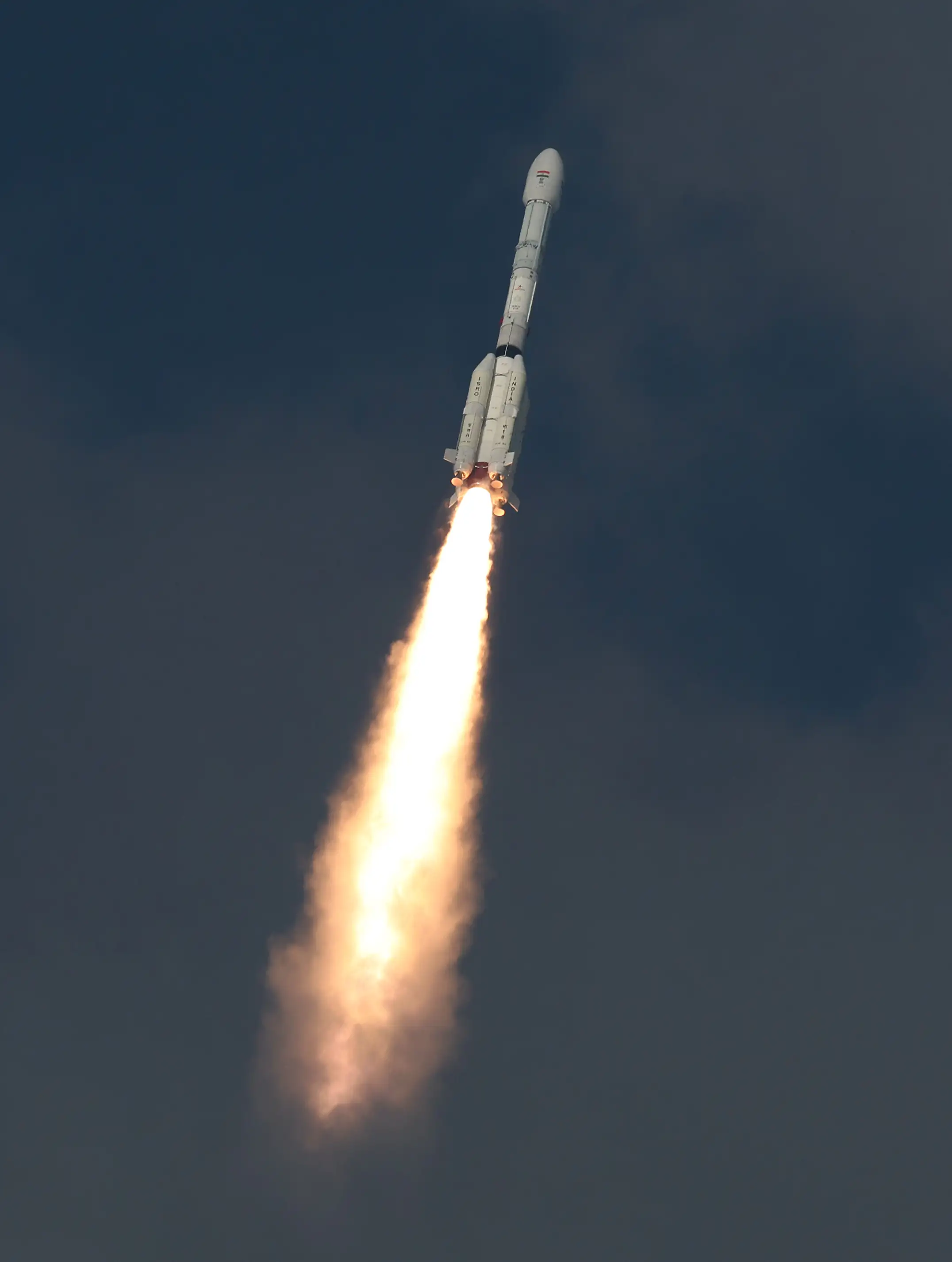
NISAR during Liftoff

== See also ==
- List of PSLV launches
- List of LVM3 launches
- List of SSLV launches
- Launch vehicles of ISRO
