= GSLV F18 =

2026 Indian satellite launch mission

GSLV - F18
GSLV Mk2 launch
- Launch: 30 October 2026 23:51, IST
- Pad: Second Launch Pad Satish Dhawan Space Centre
- Payload: (India) NVS-03
- Outcome: Success

Components
- Serial no.: F-18
- Boosters: 4 L40H
- First stage: S139
- Second stage: GL40HT
- Third stage: CUS15

GSLV launches

The GSLV F-18 was the 20th flight of the GSLV and the 14th flight of Mk2 variant using the Cryogenic Engine (CE), which was developed in-house by the Indian Space Programme.

== Mission Overview ==
=== Pre-launch ===
ISRO began the 24-hour countdown on 29 October 2026 for the spacecraft launch. The mission was to place the satellite into a Geostationary Transfer Orbit at the end of a twenty minute flight. During the pre-flight Mission Readiness Review, ISRO decided to fly the NVS-03 satellite with its pyrotechnic valves already open. This was a major departure from standard safety protocols, necessitated by the fact that the fixes from the failures on NVS-02 was not implemented during the construction of NVS-03, but only from the subsequent satellites. Hyderabad based Ananth Technologies supplied 46 sub-components for the GSLV rocket, supporting a new data-relay package that has been integrated on the rocket.

=== Launch ===
The rocket lifted off from Shriharikota at 11.51pm IST. Following an 18 minutes flight, the NVS-03 satellite was placed in a geosynchronous transfer orbit with a 170km perigee and 38,080km apogee. It was the Fifth rocket launch from Shriharikota that year. The launch revitalised the NAVIC programme, with the minimum four satellites in orbit, allowing the satellite system to function with incresed accuracy.

== Mission Statistics ==
- Mass: 420 Tonnes at Liftoff
  - Payload weight: 2,250 kg (4,960 lb)
- Overall height: ~50 m (160 ft)
- Propellant:
  - Boosters (4 L40H): UH 25 + N_{2}O_{4}
  - Stage 1 (GS1): HTPB
  - Stage 2 (GS2): UH 25 + N_{2}O_{4}
  - Stage 3 (GS3): LOX + LH_{2}
- Propellant mass:
  - Boosters (4 L40H): 170,600 kg (376,100 lb)
  - Stage 1 (GS1): 138,200 kg (304,700 lb)
  - Stage 2 (GS2): 42,100 kg (92,800 lb)
  - Stage 3 (GS3): 14,400 kg (31,700 lb)
- Perigee: 170 km (110 mi)
- Apogee: 37,023 km (23,005 mi)
- Argument of Perigee: 178° ± 0.5°
- Inclination: 20.75° ± 0.1°
- Azimuth: 106°

This launch vehicle is a 3-stage launch vehicle. The first stage of GSLV was derived from the PSLV's PS1. The 138 tonne solid rocket motor is augmented by 4 liquid strap-ons which is powered by a Vikas rocket engine.

== Payload ==
The Flight carried the NVS-03 satellite as a payload. NVS-03 is a Second generation navigation satellite, launched as a replacement for NVS-02 that though was launched successfully on GSLV F15, faced an on-board propulsion failure that rendered it inoperable. This payload is operating in L1 band, L5 band and S band. The satellite uses a highly stable indigenous Rubidium atomic clock, developed by Space Applications Center in Ahmedabad to replace the imported clocks used on the earlier satellites.

== See also ==
- List of GSLV Launches
- IRNSS
