= NVS-04 =

Indian navigation satellite

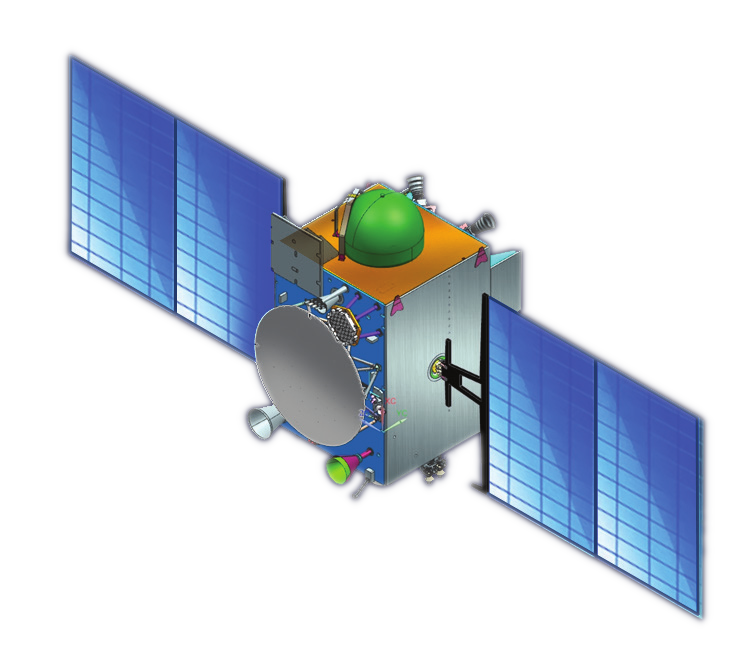
- NVS series spacecraft
- Mission type: Navigation
- Operator: ISRO
- Mission duration: Planned: 12 years Elapsed:

Spacecraft properties
- Bus: I-2K
- Manufacturer: U. R. Rao Satellite Centre; Space Applications Centre
- Launch mass: 2,250 kilograms (4,960 lb)

Start of mission
- Launch date: Not recognized as a date. Years must have 4 digits (use leading zeros for years < 1000). UTC
- Rocket: GSLV-F19
- Launch site: Satish Dhawan SLP
- Contractor: ISRO

Orbital parameters
- Reference system: Geocentric
- Regime: Geosynchronous
- Longitude: 111.75° East

NVS-04 is the fourth in the series of second generation navigation satellite (NVS) and the thirteenth satellite in the Indian Regional Navigation Satellite System (IRNSS), with an alternate name of IRNSS-1M.

== Payload ==
The second generation of NavIC satellites have two types of payloads, navigation payload and the ranging payload. The navigation payload transmits navigation service signals to the users. This payload is operating in L1 band, L5 band and S band. A highly stable Rubidium atomic clock is part of the navigation payload of the satellite. Failure of the imported Rubidium atomic clocks across the fleet of previous generation of satellite led to the creation of an indigenous option which was developed by the Space Applications Centre in Ahmedabad.

The ranging payload consists of transponder which is operated in CDMA mode for two-way range measurements. The IRNSS satellites continuously emits time stamped navigation signals, which are received by the ground-based user receivers. The information is then processed by the receivers to derive their own position, velocity and time. The system provides seamless, uninterrupted services under all weather conditions.

The new generation of navigation satellite features a new and improved encryption system for bolstering the communication of the satellite specially for the restricted users.

== Satellite ==
The satellite, weighing 2,250 kg (4,960 lb), will help in maintaining the continuity that was lagging due to the failure of Rubidium atomic clocks in previous satellites whilst bolstering the feature set with new bands and longer life. The Indian Regional Navigation Satellite System space segment consists of seven satellites. With the new series of satellites, ISRO aims to tap into the low power satellite navigation segment like smartwatches and fitness trackers whilst cementing its navigation system by allowing it to seamlessly integrate and interoperate with the existing navigation system. The inclusion of the civilian L1 band will further bolsters Indian Regional Navigation Satellite System position in the mass market.

== Launch ==
During March 2026, ISRO announced its plans to launch satellites from NVS-03 to NVS-05 by September 2027 with intervals of six months.

On 5 November 2026, ISRO conducted the flight acceptance trial for the cryogenic engine of its GSLV rocket at ISRO Propulsion Complex, Mahendragiri. The successful trial spanned 200 seconds and the ignition of both the Main Engine (ME) and the Gas Generator (GG) occurred as expected. On 10 November, ISRO announced that the engine had been selected for the GSLV F19 mission which will launch the NVS-04 satellite.

== See also ==
- Communication-Centric Intelligence Satellite (CCI-Sat)
- GPS-aided geo-augmented navigation (GAGAN)
- Satellite navigation
