= INSAT-3D =

Satellite

- Mission type: Weather
- Operator: INSAT
- COSPAR ID: 2013-038B
- SATCAT no.: 39216
- Website: http://mosdac.gov.in/content/insat-3d
- Mission duration: Planned: 7.7 years Elapsed: 13 years, 2 months

Spacecraft properties
- Bus: I-2K
- Manufacturer: ISRO Satellite Centre; Space Applications Centre
- Launch mass: 2,061 kilograms (4,544 lb)

Start of mission
- Launch date: 25 July 2013, 19:54:07 UTC
- Rocket: Ariane 5ECA
- Launch site: Kourou ELA-3
- Contractor: Arianespace

Orbital parameters
- Reference system: Geocentric
- Regime: Geostationary
- Longitude: 82° East
- Perigee altitude: 35,791 kilometres (22,239 mi)
- Apogee altitude: 35,795 kilometres (22,242 mi)
- Inclination: 0.08 degrees
- Period: 23.93 hours
- Epoch: 7 November 2013, 23:50:57 UTC

INSAT-3D is a meteorological, data relay and satellite aided search and rescue satellite developed by the Indian Space Research Organisation and was launched successfully on 26 July 2013 using an Ariane 5 ECA launch vehicle from French Guiana. The satellite has many new technology elements like star sensor, micro stepping Solar Array Drive Assembly (SADA) to reduce the spacecraft disturbances and Bus Management Unit (BMU) for control and telecom and telemetry function. It also incorporates new features of bi-annual rotation and Image and Mirror motion compensations for improved performance of the meteorological payloads.

== Mission ==
The mission goal is stated as "to provide an operational, environmental & storm warning system to protect life & property and also to monitor earth’s surface and carryout oceanic observations and also provide data dissemination capabilities."

=== Payloads ===
The satellite has four payloads:

- 6 channel multi-spectral Imager
- 19 channel sounder
- Data Relay Transponder (DRT)
- Satellite Aided Search and Rescue (SAS&R)

The sounder has not been operational since September 2020.

=== Launch ===
The satellite was expected to be launched using the GSLV Mk-II. On December 4, 2010, ISRO Chairman revealed that ISRO was considering the use of an Ariane 5 ECA launch vehicle for the launch. The launch was successfully carried out on 26 July 2013 from French Guiana. INSAT-3D was launched along with AlphaSat, which is Europe's largest telecommunication satellite.

=== Retirement ===
The INSAT 3D satellite's replacement, INSAT 3DS launched on GSLV F14 on 17 February 2024. It would be retired as its functionality was slowly deteriorating and would be used for a different purpose.
