= GSAT-7R =

Indian Navy communication satellite

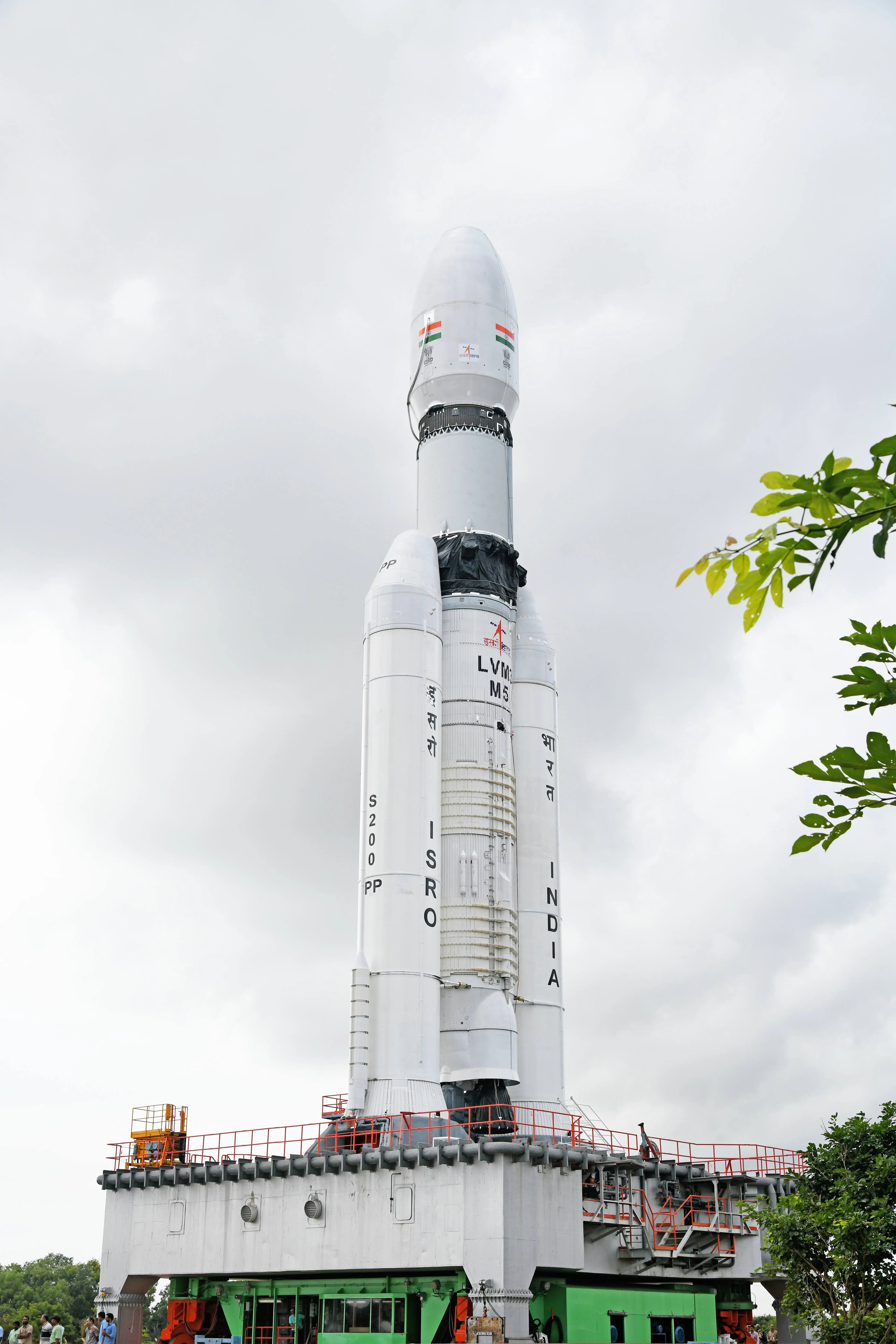
- LVM3-M5 equipped with GSAT-7R, being transferred to the Second Launch Pad
- Mission type: Communication
- Operator: Indian Navy
- COSPAR ID: 2025-249B
- SATCAT no.: 66311
- Website: CMS-03
- Mission duration: Planned: 15 years Elapsed: 1 year, 12 days

Spacecraft properties
- Manufacturer: U. R. Rao Satellite Centre
- Launch mass: 4,410 kilograms (9,720 lb)

Start of mission
- Launch date: 2 November 2025, 11:56 UTC
- Rocket: LVM3-M5
- Launch site: Satish Dhawan Space Centre, Sriharikota
- Entered service: 2 November 2025

Orbital parameters
- Reference system: Geocentric orbit
- Regime: Geostationary orbit

GSAT-7R (also known as CMS-03) is a multi-band communication satellite developed by ISRO for the Indian Navy. The satellite is meant to replace the existing and operational GSAT-7.

== Satellite ==
The satellite, weighing 4,410 kilograms (9,720 lb), is meant to transmit voice, video and data among the naval ships, submarines, aircraft and Maritime Operation Centres of the Indian Navy deployed across the Indian Ocean Region, covering up to 2,000 km from India's coastline.

The satellite employs advanced payloads in multiple frequency bands, including UHF, S, C and Ku bands. It is also equipped with indigenous components like a 1,200 litres (260 imp gal; 320 US gal) propulsion tank and collapsible antenna systems. It also has a planned lifespan of 15 years.

The contract for the ₹1,589 crore (US$225.65 million) satellite project was signed on 11 June 2019 between the Indian Navy and the ISRO.

== History ==
During the time of contract signing in 2019, the projected launch date of the satellite was expected between 2020 and 2022.By August 2025, the delivery timeline had slipped by few years to November 2025. By 23 October, the launch date was scheduled on 2 November. The vehicle performance of LMV3-M5 had been enhanced by 10% to accommodate the CMS-03 satellite which is heavier than its payload capacity of 4 tonnes (3.9 long tons; 4.4 short tons) for GTO orbits.

The satellite assembly and integration with launch vehicle has been completed by early October 2025. The launch vehicle was moved to the launchpad on 26 October and pre-launch procedures were initiated thereafter. It is the heaviest satellite to be launched to the Geostationary Transfer Orbit from India till date. A preflight inspection fixed problems in the fuel control systems that plagued the NVS-02 satellite which used a similar spacecraft bus.

On 2 November 2025, at 5:26 pm IST, ISRO successfully placed the CMS-03 satellite into the desired orbit through the LVM3-M5 rocket from the Second Launch Pad of the Satish Dhawan Space Centre, Sriharikota. The mission featured an experiment, re-ignition of the cryogenic upper stage. The satellite was separated from the launch vehicle at around 16 minutes in sub-GTO orbit. from launch with a perigee of 26,700 kilometres (16,600 mi). The upper stage of the rocket was passivated. Given the NORAD ID 66310 and International Designator (COSPAR ID) 2025-249A, the stage re-entered the planet's atmosphere by 12:08 UTC on 30 July 2026 over the Atlantic Ocean.

In September 2026, the Indian Navy issued an expression of interest to the Indian industry to develop a ship-based C- and Ku-band satellite communication terminals, to be known as Rukmini terminals, to communicate through GSAT-7R. The indigenous terminals are expected to replace the Israeli-origin SATCOM terminals which are currently deployed onboard Indian warships and maintained by Bharat Electronics. The older terminals were procured 10-12 years ago.

== See also ==
- Indian National Satellite System
- GSAT
- List of Indian satellites
- Defence Space Agency
- Indian military satellites
- GSAT-7 – Indian Navy communication satellite
- GSAT-7A – Indian Air Force and Army communication satellite
- GSAT-7B – Planned communication satellite for the Indian Army
- GSAT-7C – Planned communication satellite for the Indian Air Force
