= GSAT-7C =

Planned communication satellite for the Indian Air Force

- Mission type: Communication
- Operator: Indian Air Force

Spacecraft properties
- Manufacturer: U R Rao Satellite Centre

Start of mission
- Launch date: 2027 or 2028
- Rocket: GSLV

Orbital parameters
- Reference system: Geocentric orbit
- Regime: Geostationary orbit

GSAT-7C (Geosynchronous satellite 7C) is a planned Indian military communication satellite for the Indian Air Force, as part of the GSAT series.

== History ==
On 23 November 2021, the Defence Acquisition Council under the Defence Minister Rajnath Singh approved the Acceptance of Necessity (AoN) of the satellite project. The project is worth ₹2,236 crore (equivalent to ₹27 billion or US$280 million in 2026). The funds were allocated for the development of the satellite and ground hubs for real-time connectivity of software defined radios. Complete design, development, and launching of the satellite will be in India.

It will be based on ISRO's I-2000 kg (I-2K) Bus. The ₹2,563 crore (US$270 million) contract to manufacture and launch the satellite was signed with NSIL on 15 October 2026 with the satellite expected to become operational by 2030s.

== Satellite ==
The satellite will allow beyond the line of sight communications for the Indian Armed Forces to use their BNET SDRs. It's different from other GSAT military satellites because it will be dedicated to secure link software-defined radio communications only. GSAT-7, is a series of satellites developed by Indian Space Research Organisation for the use of Indian Armed Forces. Two satellites in this series are currently functional (7 and 7A) and three more (7R, 7B, and 7C) are planned. The satellite is expected to be launched using a GSLV Mk II rocket. On 15 October 2026, Ministry of Defence signed a contract with NSIL worth ₹2,563 crore (US$270 million) for GSAT-7C satellite.

== See also ==
- Indian National Satellite System
- GSAT
- List of Indian satellites
- Defence Space Agency
- Indian military satellites
- GSAT-7 – Indian Navy communication satellite
- GSAT-7R – Indian Navy communication satellite
- GSAT-7A – Indian Air Force and Army communication satellite
- GSAT-7B – Planned communication satellite for the Indian Army
