= NVS-03 =

Indian navigation satellite

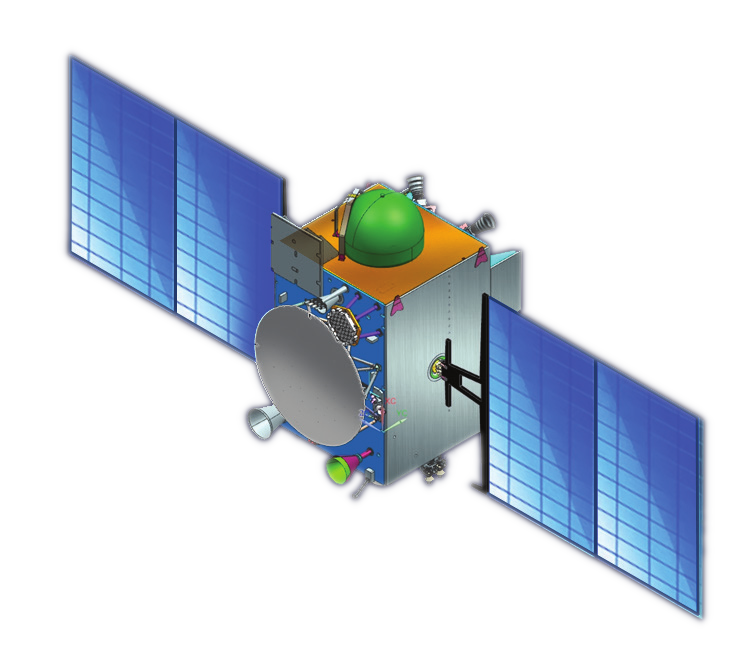
- NVS series spacecraft
- Mission type: Navigation
- Operator: ISRO
- COSPAR ID: 2026-245A
- SATCAT no.: 101228
- Mission duration: Planned: 12 years Elapsed: 12 days

Spacecraft properties
- Bus: I-2K
- Manufacturer: U. R. Rao Satellite Centre; Space Applications Centre
- Launch mass: 2,250 kilograms (4,960 lb)

Start of mission
- Launch date: 30 October 2026
- Rocket: GSLV-F18
- Launch site: Satish Dhawan SLP
- Contractor: ISRO

Orbital parameters
- Reference system: Geocentric
- Regime: Geosynchronous
- Longitude: 111.75° East

NVS-03 is the third in the series of second generation navigation satellite (NVS) and the twelfth satellite in the Indian Regional Navigation Satellite System (IRNSS), with an alternate name of, IRNSS-1L. It will augment the existing satellite and bolster the capability of the NavIC constellation by adding more robustness and new features.

== Payload ==
NVS-03 has two types of payloads, navigation payload and the ranging payload. The navigation payload transmits navigation service signals to the users. This payload is operating in L1 band, L5 band and S band. A highly stable Rubidium atomic clock is part of the navigation payload of the satellite. Failure of the imported Rubidium atomic clocks across the fleet of previous generation of satellite led to the creation of an indigenous option which was developed by the Space Applications Centre in Ahmedabad. NVS-03 carried the third indigenous atomic clock to orbit.

The ranging payload consists of transponder which is operated in CDMA mode for two-way range measurements. The IRNSS satellites continuously emits time stamped navigation signals, which are received by the ground-based user receivers. The information is then processed by the receivers to derive their own position, velocity and time. The system provides seamless, uninterrupted services under all weather conditions.

The new generation of navigation satellite features a new and improved encryption system for bolstering the communication of the satellite specially for the restricted users.

== Satellite ==
The satellite, weighing 2,250 kg (4,960 lb), will help in maintaining the continuity that was lagging due to the failure of Rubidium atomic clocks in previous satellites whilst bolstering the feature set with new bands and longer life. The Indian Regional Navigation Satellite System space segment consists of seven satellites. With the new series of satellites, ISRO aims to tap into the low power satellite navigation segment like smartwatches and fitness trackers whilst cementing its navigation system by allowing it to seamlessly integrate and interoperate with the existing navigation system. The inclusion of the civilian L1 band will further bolsters Indian Regional Navigation Satellite System position in the mass market.

== Launch ==
The satellite had been sent to the Satish Dhawan Space Centre and was ready for launch by 14 August 2026. The launch campaign commenced on 14 September. According to reports, the stacking of the first stage of the rocket was completed by 21 September. The satellite was launched on 30 October 2026 at 23:51 IST onboard GSLV F18 mission. The satellite reached the intended elliptical geosynchronous transfer orbit (GTO) after 18 minutes from launch.

The launch was first instance in the history of ISRO where the pyro valves of the satellite were kept open during launch. This move was taken as a precautionary measure after NVS-02, the previous satellite in the series, failed to reach its designated geosynchronous orbit even though the launch vehicle had placed it in the required geosynchronous transfer orbit (GTO) as the valves for admitting the oxidizer fuel for the liquid apogee motor (LAM) did not open. Further, this was the third launch by ISRO in 2026 following the failure of PSLV-C62. Both of the second and third launch was conducted by a GSLV Mk II rocket with a turnaround time of just 56 days.

== Service ==
The satellite was placed at an initial geosynchronous transfer orbit (GTO) of 170.3 km × 38,080 km (105.8 mi × 23,661.8 mi) against an intended orbit of 170.3 km × 37,247 km (105.8 mi × 23,144.2 mi). Thereafter the liquid apogee motor (LAM) engine fired for 2,174.8 seconds during the satellite's first orbit manoeuvre on 31 October 2026 at 16:48 IST which placed it at an approximate orbit of 5,477.6 km × 37,833.4 km (3,403.6 mi × 23,508.6 mi) at an inclination of 20.75° to the equator. The satellite is meant to occupy te 111.75° East orbital slot of the geosynchronous orbit (GSO). By 4 November. a total of four orbit manoeuvres during which LAM engine fired for a total of 6,164 seconds. The satellite was eventually placed at an altitude of 35,765 km × 36,196 km (22,223 mi × 22,491 mi) at an inclination of 29.98° to the equator. The relaying of information would subsequentlt commence within a few days.

== See also ==
- Communication-Centric Intelligence Satellite (CCI-Sat)
- GPS-aided geo-augmented navigation (GAGAN)
- Satellite navigation
