= GSAT-7B =

Planned communication satellite for the Indian Army

- Mission type: Communication
- Operator: Indian Army

Spacecraft properties
- Manufacturer: U R Rao Satellite Centre

Start of mission
- Launch date: April 2028
- Rocket: GSLV

Orbital parameters
- Reference system: Geocentric orbit
- Regime: Geostationary orbit

GSAT-7B (Geosynchronous satellite 7B) is planned to be first dedicated military satellite for the Indian Army, launched as part of the GSAT series.

== Description ==
The approval was granted by Defence Acquisition Council (DAC) on 21 March 2023. The multiband military satellite, featuring integrated communication for network-centric operations, will be launched by 2027. Contract for a 5-tonne satellite signed with NewSpace India Limited (NSIL), worth ₹2,963 crore (equivalent to ₹32 billion or US$340 million in 2026) on 29 March 2023. The satellite would provide beyond line of sight communication to troops and formations as well as weapon and airborne platforms.

The launch was initially scheduled for November 2027, but was later delayed to April 2028 due to technical reasons.

== See also ==
- Indian National Satellite System
- GSAT
- List of Indian satellites
- Defence Space Agency
- Indian military satellites
- GSAT-7 – Indian Navy communication satellite
- GSAT-7R – Indian Navy communication satellite
- GSAT-7A – Indian Air Force and Army communication satellite
- GSAT-7C – Planned communication satellite for the Indian Air Force
