= GSLV F19 =

Future Indian satellite launch mission

GSLV - F19
GSLV Mk2 launch
- Launch: 2027
- Pad: Second Launch Pad Satish Dhawan Space Centre
- Payload: (India) NVS-04

Components
- Serial no.: F-19
- Boosters: 4 L40H
- First stage: S139
- Second stage: GL40HT
- Third stage: CUS15

GSLV launches

The GSLV F-19 will be the 21st flight of the GSLV and the 15th flight of Mk2 variant using indigenous Cryogenic Engine (CE).

== Mission Overview ==
=== Pre-launch ===
Following the success of the previous GSLV Flight, ISRO commenced testing for the next launch of the GSLV rocket. On November 05 2026, ISRO conducted the flight acceptance test for the cryogenic engine that is planned to be used on this flight at IPRC Mahendragiri. The engine burn duration is of 200 seconds.

== Mission Statistics ==
- Mass: 420 Tonnes at Liftoff
  - Payload weight: 2,250 kg (4,960 lb)
- Overall height: ~50 m (160 ft)
- Propellant:
  - Boosters (4 L40H): UH 25 + N_{2}O_{4}
  - Stage 1 (GS1): HTPB
  - Stage 2 (GS2): UH 25 + N_{2}O_{4}
  - Stage 3 (GS3): LOX + LH_{2}
- Propellant mass:
  - Boosters (4 L40H): 170,600 kg (376,100 lb)
  - Stage 1 (GS1): 138,200 kg (304,700 lb)
  - Stage 2 (GS2): 42,100 kg (92,800 lb)
  - Stage 3 (GS3): 14,400 kg (31,700 lb)
- Perigee: 170 km (110 mi)
- Apogee: 37,023 km (23,005 mi)
- Argument of Perigee: 178° ± 0.5°
- Inclination: 20.75° ± 0.1°
- Azimuth: 106°

This launch vehicle is a 3-stage launch vehicle. The first stage of GSLV was derived from the PSLV's PS1. The 138 tonne solid rocket motor is augmented by 4 liquid strap-ons which is powered by a Vikas rocket engine.

== Payload ==
ISRO plans to launch the NVS-04 Navigation satellite on this mission. The NVS series succeeds the IRNSS series as a second generation navigation satellite that will be used for the NAVIC project. The satellite would use an indigenousatomic clock.

== See also ==
- List of GSLV Launches
- IRNSS
