= GSAT-7 =

Indian Navy communication satellite

- Mission type: Communication
- Operator: ISRO
- COSPAR ID: 2013-044B
- SATCAT no.: 39234
- Mission duration: Planned: 7 years Elapsed: 13 years, 1 month, 17 days

Spacecraft properties
- Bus: I-2K
- Manufacturer: ISRO; Space Applications Centre
- Launch mass: 2,650 kilograms (5,840 lb)
- Power: 3 kilowatts

Start of mission
- Launch date: 29 August 2013, 20:30 UTC
- Rocket: Ariane 5ECA
- Launch site: Kourou ELA-3
- Contractor: Arianespace

Orbital parameters
- Reference system: Geocentric
- Regime: Geostationary
- Longitude: 74° East
- Perigee altitude: 35,779 kilometres (22,232 mi)
- Apogee altitude: 35,806 kilometres (22,249 mi)
- Inclination: 0.06 degrees
- Period: 23.93 hours
- Epoch: 7 November 2013, 23:12:49 UTC

Transponders
- Band: UHF; C-band; Ku-band

GSAT-7 or INSAT-4F is a multi-band military communications satellite developed by ISRO. The Indian Navy is the user of the multi-band communication spacecraft, which has been operational since September 2013. According to defense experts, the satellite will enable the navy to extend its blue water capabilities and stop relying on foreign satellites like Inmarsat, which provide communication services to its ships.

== Satellite ==
GSAT-7, the multi-band communication satellite named Rukmini carries the payloads in UHF, C band and K_{u} band. It is the first dedicated military communication satellite (unlike earlier dual use satellites) built by ISRO that will provide services to the Indian Armed Forces with the main user being the Indian Navy. Its procured launch cost has been put at ₹480 crore, with the satellite costing ₹185 crore. Cost of whole project per Memorandum of Understanding with ISRO was ₹950 crores.

The multiple-band spacecraft will be used exclusively by the Navy to shore up secure, real-time communications among its warships, submarines, aircraft and land systems. GSAT-7/ INSAT-4F is said to significantly improve the country's naval operations around the world.

GSAT 7 satellite carrying payloads operating in UHF, S, C and Ku bands, had a lift-off mass of 2,650 kilograms (5,840 lb) and is based on ISRO's 2,000 kilograms (4,400 lb) class satellite bus I-2K with some new technological elements, including the antennae. After a flight of almost 34 minutes, the satellite was injected into a geosynchronous transfer orbit (GTO) of 249-kilometre (155 mi) perigee, 35,929-kilometre (22,325 mi) apogee and an inclination of 3.5 degree with respect to the equator.

ISRO launched a second satellite, GSAT-7A for Indian Air Force on 19 December 2018 on its Geosynchronous Satellite Launch Vehicle (GSLV-F11).

== Launch ==
The satellite was launched early on 30 August 2013 atop an Ariane 5 ECA rocket from Kourou, French Guiana.

India's first dedicated military satellite was put into a geosynchronous orbit, about 36,000 kilometres (22,000 mi) above Earth, five days after it was launched after three orbit-raising manoeuvres from ISRO's Master Control Facility at Hassan in Karnataka. The 2.5 tonnes (2.5 long tons; 2.8 short tons) spacecraft's antennae, including the ultra-high frequency Helix antenna were deployed before it was stabilised on its three-axis in the orbit. All of the on-board transponders were switched on successfully on September 18, 2013

== Capability ==
Rukmini will provide networking capabilities to various Indian Naval assets. During the 2014 edition of Theatre Level Operational Readiness Exercise in the Bay of Bengal, Rukmini was able to provide a common network about 60 ships and 75 aircraft seamlessly. Rukmini has a nearly 2,000 nautical miles (3,700 km; 2,300 mi) 'footprint' over the Indian Ocean Region.

== Replacement ==
The Indian Navy placed an order for GSAT-7R on June 11, 2019. GSAT-7R is expected to eventually replace GSAT-7.

== See also ==
- Indian National Satellite System
- GSAT
- List of Indian satellites
- Defence Space Agency
- Indian military satellites
- GSAT-7R – Indian Navy communication satellite
- GSAT-7A – Military communications satellite
- GSAT-7B – Planned communication satellite for the Indian Army
- GSAT-7C – Planned communication satellite for the Indian Air Force
