= INSAT-3DS =

Meteorological satellite by India

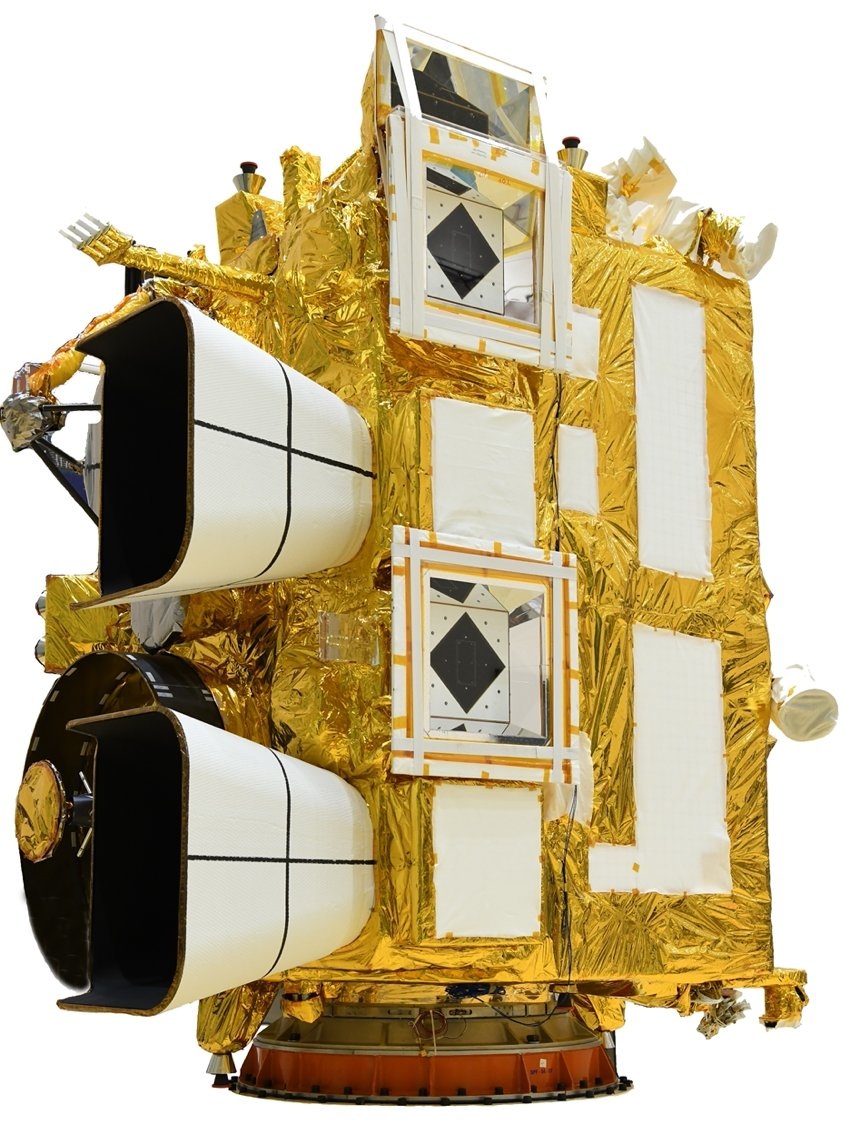
- INSAT 3DS
- Mission type: Weather satellite
- Operator: ISRO, MoES
- COSPAR ID: 2024-033A
- SATCAT no.: 58990
- Website: www.isro.gov.in
- Mission duration: Planned: 10 years Elapsed: 1 year, 9 months, 5 days

Spacecraft properties
- Spacecraft: INSAT-3DS
- Manufacturer: Indian Space Research Organisation
- Launch mass: 2,275 kg (5,016 lb)
- Dry mass: 907 kg (2,000 lb)
- Power: 1164 W

Start of mission
- Launch date: 17 February 2024, 12:05 UTC
- Rocket: GSLV Mk II – F14
- Launch site: Satish Dhawan Space Centre SLP
- Contractor: Indian Space Research Organisation

Orbital parameters
- Reference system: Geocentric orbit
- Regime: Geostationary orbit

INSAT-3DS is an Indian meteorological satellite built by the Indian Space Research Organisation (ISRO). The satellite is a follow on of INSAT-3DR mission. The satellite was launched on 17 February 2024 at 17:35 IST from the Satish Dhawan Space Centre.

== Satellite Payloads ==
Payload	Usage
DRT	Data Relay Transponder
SAS&R	Advanced Aided Search & Rescue
IMAGER	6 channel imager
SOUNDER	19 channel sounder

== Launch ==
The INSAT-3DS satellite was initially planned to be launched in January 2024 but was later delayed to February. The satellite was launched via the GSLV-F14 rocket on 17 February 2024 at 17:35 IST (12:05 UTC). This was the first time the extended version of Cryogenic upper stage of the GSLV rocket, CUS-15 was flown with environment friendly white fairing. Five days later, all four planned Liquid Apogee Motor (LAM) firings were completed. The spacecraft is now in the geosynchronous orbit. It is expected to reach the In Orbit Testing (IOT) location by Feb 28, 2024, following which it will go to its designated orbital slot.
