= INSAT-3DR =

Indian weather satellite

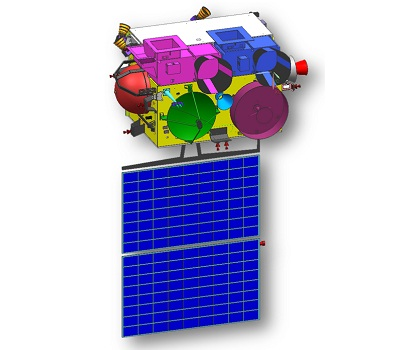
- INSAT-3DR with solar panel deployed
- Names: Indian National Satellite 3D Repeat
- Mission type: Weather satellite
- Operator: INSAT
- COSPAR ID: 2016-054A
- SATCAT no.: 41752
- Website: http://mosdac.gov.in/content/insat-3dr
- Mission duration: Planned: 10 years Elapsed: 9 years, 5 months, 23 days

Spacecraft properties
- Bus: I-2K
- Manufacturer: ISRO Satellite Centre; Space Applications Centre
- Launch mass: 2,211 kg (4,874 lb)
- Dry mass: 956 kg (2,108 lb)
- Power: 1,700 W

Start of mission
- Launch date: 8 September 2016, 11:20 UTC
- Rocket: GSLV Mk II F05
- Launch site: Satish Dhawan SLP
- Contractor: ISRO

Orbital parameters
- Reference system: Geocentric
- Regime: Geostationary
- Longitude: 74° E
- Epoch: Planned
Instruments
- DCS: Data Collection Service
- SAS&R: Advanced Aided Search & Rescue
- IMAGER: INSAT imager
- SOUNDER: INSAT sounder

INSAT-3DR is an Indian weather satellite built by the Indian Space Research Organisation and operated by the Indian National Satellite System, also known as INSAT It provides meteorological services to India using a 6-channel imager and a 19-channel sounder, as well as search and rescue information and message relay for terrestrial data collection platforms. The satellite was launched on 8 September 2016, and is a follow-up to INSAT-3D.

== Satellite payload ==
Payload	Usage
DCS	Data Collection Service
SAS&R	Advanced Aided Search & Rescue
IMAGER	INSAT imager
SOUNDER	INSAT sounder

== Launch ==
INSAT-3DR was successfully launched on 8 September 2016 at 11:20 UTC aboard a Geosynchronous Satellite Launch Vehicle (GSLV Mk II) from the Satish Dhawan Space Centre, which was delayed from 28 August. The rocket placed it into a geostationary transfer orbit for eventual stationing in geosynchronous orbit at 74° E.
