= GSLV F15 =

2025 Indian satellite launch mission

GSLV - F15
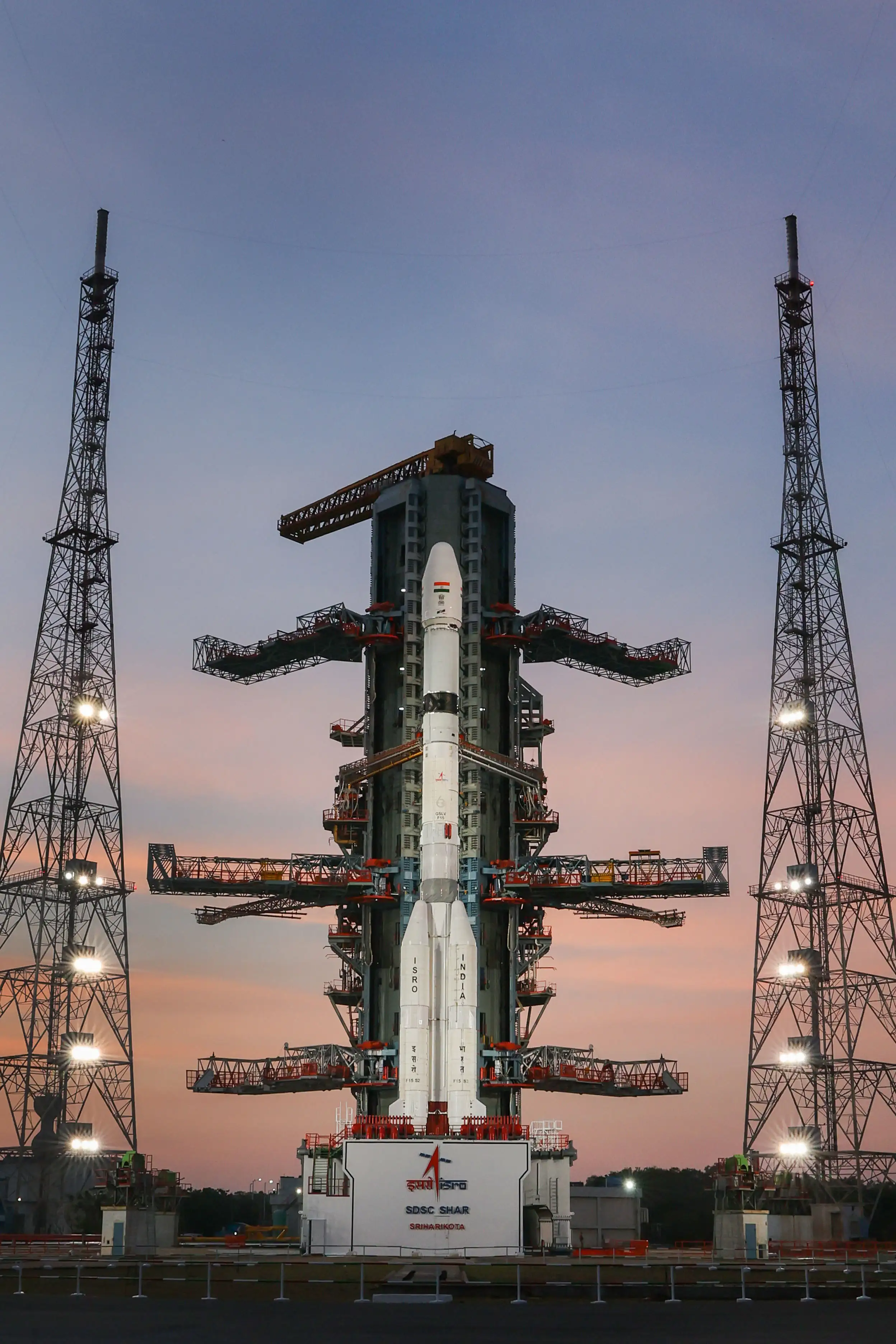
- GSLV-F15 Launch Vehicle at Second Launch Pad

GSLV launch
- Launch: 29 January 2025, 06:23 IST
- Pad: Second Launch Pad Satish Dhawan Space Centre
- Payload: (India) NVS-02

GSLV launches

The GSLV F15 is the 17th flight of the GSLV and the 11th flight of Mk2 variant using indigenous Cryogenic engine. It is also the 100th overall launch of an ISRO rocket since SLV-3 E1 in 1979.

== Launch ==
The GSLV-F15, carrying the NVS-02 satellite, lifted off from the spaceport's second launch pad at 06:23 IST. The satellite was injected into a geostationary transfer orbit (GTO) 19 minutes after launch from Sriharikota.

It was the First mission undertaken by newly appointed ISRO chairman Dr. V. Narayanan.

== Mission overview ==
Primary payload: NVS-02.

This launch vehicle is an 3-stage launch vehicle. The first stage of GSLV was also derived from the PSLV's PS1. The 138 tonne solid rocket motor is augmented by 4 liquid strap-ons which is powered by a Vikas rocket engine. GSLV-F15 payload fairing is a metallic version with a diameter of 3.4 meters.

== Mission Statistics ==
- Mass: 420.7 Tonnes at Liftoff
  - Payload weight: 2250kg
- Overall height: 50.9 m (167 ft)
- Propellant:
  - Boosters (L40): UDMH+ N_{2}O_{4}
  - Stage 1 (S139): HTPB
  - Stage 2 (GL40-HT): UDMH+ N_{2}O_{4}
  - Stage 3 (GS-3-CUS): LOX + LH_{2}
- Propellant mass:
  - Boosters: 42,700 kg (94,100 lb)
  - Stage 1: 138,100 kg (304,500 lb)
  - Stage 2: 42,150 kg (92,920 lb)
  - Stage 3: 14,960 kg (32,980 lb)
- Altitude: Perigee: 170 km Apogee: 36577 km
- Inclination:20.79 ± 0.1 °
- Azimuth:106 °

This launch vehicle is an 3-stage launch vehicle. The first stage of GSLV was also derived from the PSLV's PS1. The 138 tonne solid rocket motor is augmented by 4 liquid strap-ons which is powered by a Vikas rocket engine.
