= Valve leakage =

Valve leakage refers to flow through a valve which is set in the 'off' state.

The importance of valve leakage depends on what the valve is controlling. For example, a dripping tap is less significant than a leak from a six-inch pipe carrying high-pressure radioactive steam.

In the United States, the American National Standards Institute specifies six different leakage classes, with "leakage" defined in terms of the full open valve capacity:

- Class I, or 'dust-tight' valves, are intended to work but have not been tested
- Class II valves have no more than 0.5% leakage with 50 psi (340 kPa) (or less if operating pressure is less) of air pressure at the operating temperature
- Class III valves have no more than 0.1% leakage under those conditions; this may require soft valve seats, or lapped metal surfaces
- Class IV valves have no more than 0.01% leakage under those conditions; this tends to require multiple graphite piston rings or a single Teflon piston ring, and lapped metal seats.
- Class V valves leak less than 5×10^{−12} cubic metres, per second, per bar of pressure differential, per millimetre of port diameter, of water when tested at the service pressure.

Class VI valves are slightly different in that they are required (at 50 psi (340 kPa) or operating pressure, whichever is less) to have less than a specified leakage rate in millilitres of air per minute:

Size	Leakage	
Size	ml/min	Bubbles/min
1 inch	0.15	1
1.5 inch	0.30	2
2 inch	0.45	3
2.5 inch	0.60	4
3 inch	0.90	6
4 inch	1.70	11
6 inch	4.00	27
8 inch	6.75	45
10 inch	9	63
12 inch	11.5	81
