= GSAT-7A =

Indian Air Force and Army communication satellite

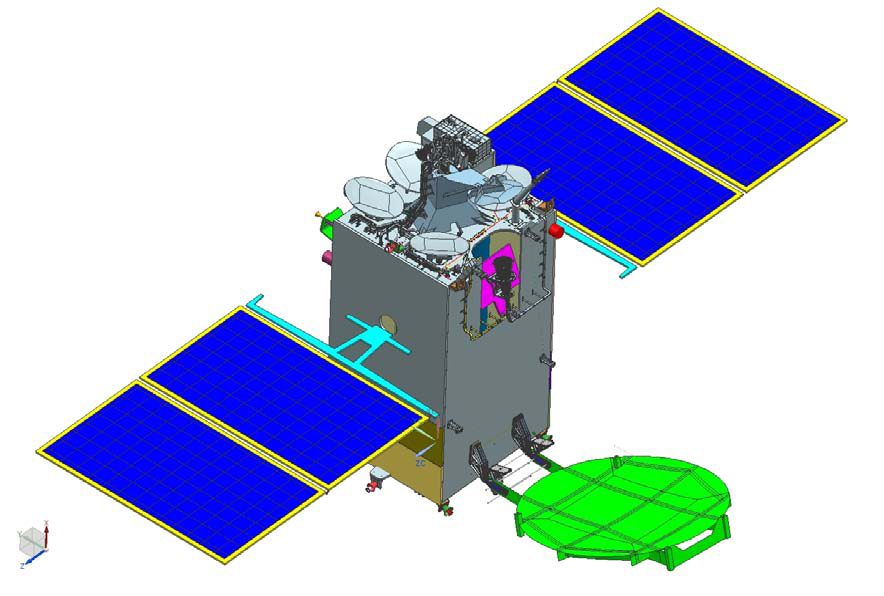
- Mission type: Communications
- Operator: Indian Air Force; Indian Army
- COSPAR ID: 2018-105A
- SATCAT no.: 43864
- Mission duration: Planned: 8 years Elapsed: 7 years, 9 months, 27 days

Spacecraft properties
- Bus: I-2K
- Manufacturer: ISRO Satellite Centre; Space Applications Centre
- Launch mass: 2,250 kilograms (4,960 lb)
- Power: 3.3 kilowatts

Start of mission
- Launch date: 19 December 2018; 10:40 UTC
- Rocket: GSLV Mk.II F11
- Launch site: Satish Dhawan SLP
- Contractor: ISRO

Orbital parameters
- Reference system: Geocentric
- Regime: Geostationary
- Slot: 63°E

Transponders
- Band: Ku band
- Coverage area: India

GSAT-7A is an advanced military communications satellite meant primarily for the Indian Air Force with Indian Army using 30% of capacity.

== Overview ==
GSAT-7A allows IAF to interlink different ground radar stations, ground airbase, aircraft to aircraft Real-time Control System, AEW&C aircraft such as Beriev A-50-based Phalcon and DRDO Netra. The satellite enhances network-centric warfare capabilities of the Indian Air Force and its global operations. The satellite is also used by Indian Army's Aviation Corps for real-time control and communication of its aviation operations. India is in the process of acquiring high-altitude long endurance satellite-controlled UAVs, such as American armed MQ-9B Predator drones, that can fire at enemy targets from long distances.

As of December 2018, there are 320 dual use or dedicated military satellite in the sky, half of which are owned by the United States, followed by Russia, China and India (14). To boost its network-centric operations, the IAF is also likely to get another satellite GSAT-7C within a few years.

The GSAT-7A, with a mission life of 8 years, is also equipped with the payload of 10 Ku band transponders, which offers several advantages over c-band, such more powerful satellite uplink and downlink signals, smaller antennas, and non-interference of communication signals with terrestrial microwave systems.

Payload:

- 10 channels in Ku band with switchable frequency for mobile users.
- Four steerable antennas
- One fixed Gregorian Antenna.

== Launch ==
GSAT-7A weighing 2,250 kilograms (4,960 lb) was successfully launched on 19 December 2018 by GSLV Mk II F11 rocket from Second Launch Pad of Satish Dhawan Space Centre. This three-stage launch vehicle is 51 metres (167 ft) tall, has a lift-off mass of about 421 tonnes (414 long tons; 464 short tons) and indigenously developed cryogenic stage. The satellite remains in service despite having surpassed its operation lifespan. The IAF seeks to replace it with GSAT-7C.

== See also ==
- Indian National Satellite System
- GSAT
- List of Indian satellites
- Defence Space Agency
- Indian military satellites
- GSAT-7 – Indian Navy communication satellite
- GSAT-7R – Indian Navy communication satellite
- GSAT-7B – Planned communication satellite for the Indian Army
- GSAT-7C – Planned communication satellite for the Indian Air Force
