= Pyrotechnic valves =

One time use propulsion component

A pyrotechnic valve, also explosive actuated valve, short pyro valve or pyrovalve is a one time use propulsion component often used to control propellant or pressurant systems aboard spacecraft or space probes. The device is activated by an electric signal, upon which one or several small explosive charges are ignited. These in turn produce high-pressure gas which either push a small, perforated piston which initially blocked the flow path of the working fluid forward until the hole aligns with the tubing, allowing the working fluid to flow, or force a sharpened piston through a weakened part of the attached tube to block the flow path of the working fluid. These two versions of pyrotechnic valves are referred to as normally-closed (NC) or normally-open (NO) valves respectively, depending on their initial state before initiation of the pyrotechnic charge. Modern pyrotechnic valves feature two redundant explosive charges in order to maximize reliability of the valve.

There are several advantages of pyrotechnic valves over other types of valves, such as solenoid valves:

- Pyrotechnic valves have an extremely fast response time (time from the actuation signal reaching the device til the valve has closed/opened), often in the order of a few milliseconds.
- Normally-closed pyro valves have a far lower leak rate than other valves, allowing them to hermetically seal propellant inside a tank to keep it from evaporating into space before activation. This is especially useful on spacecraft which spend years or decades coasting through space before reaching their destination. If propellant is needed only every few years or so, NO pyro valves and NC pyro valves can be arranged in pairs, breaking the seal when required, then sealing it again afterwards. This type of system is being referred to as a pyro ladder.
The inner workings of pyro valves
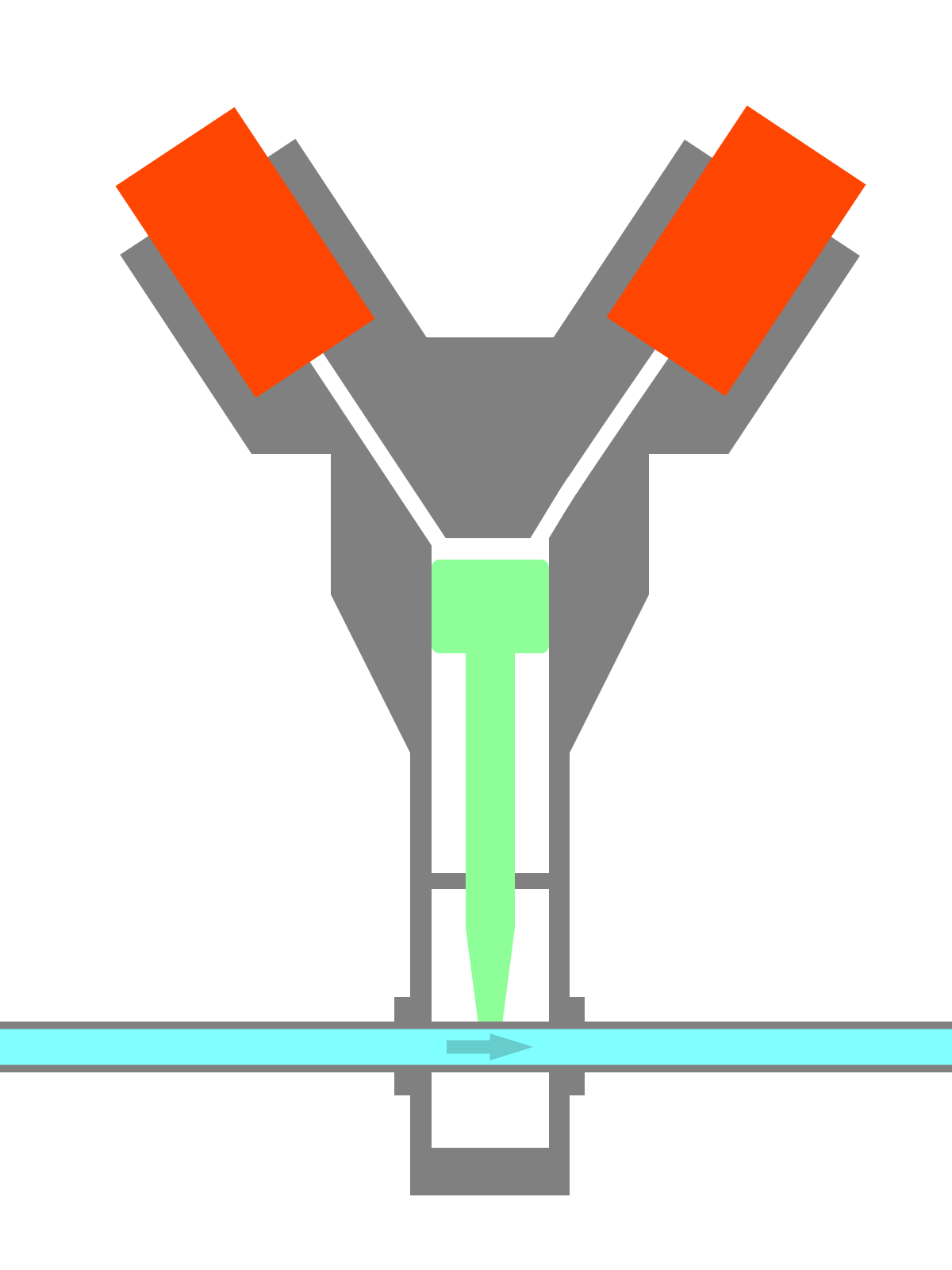
Normally open pyrovalve before activation. The fluid can still pass.

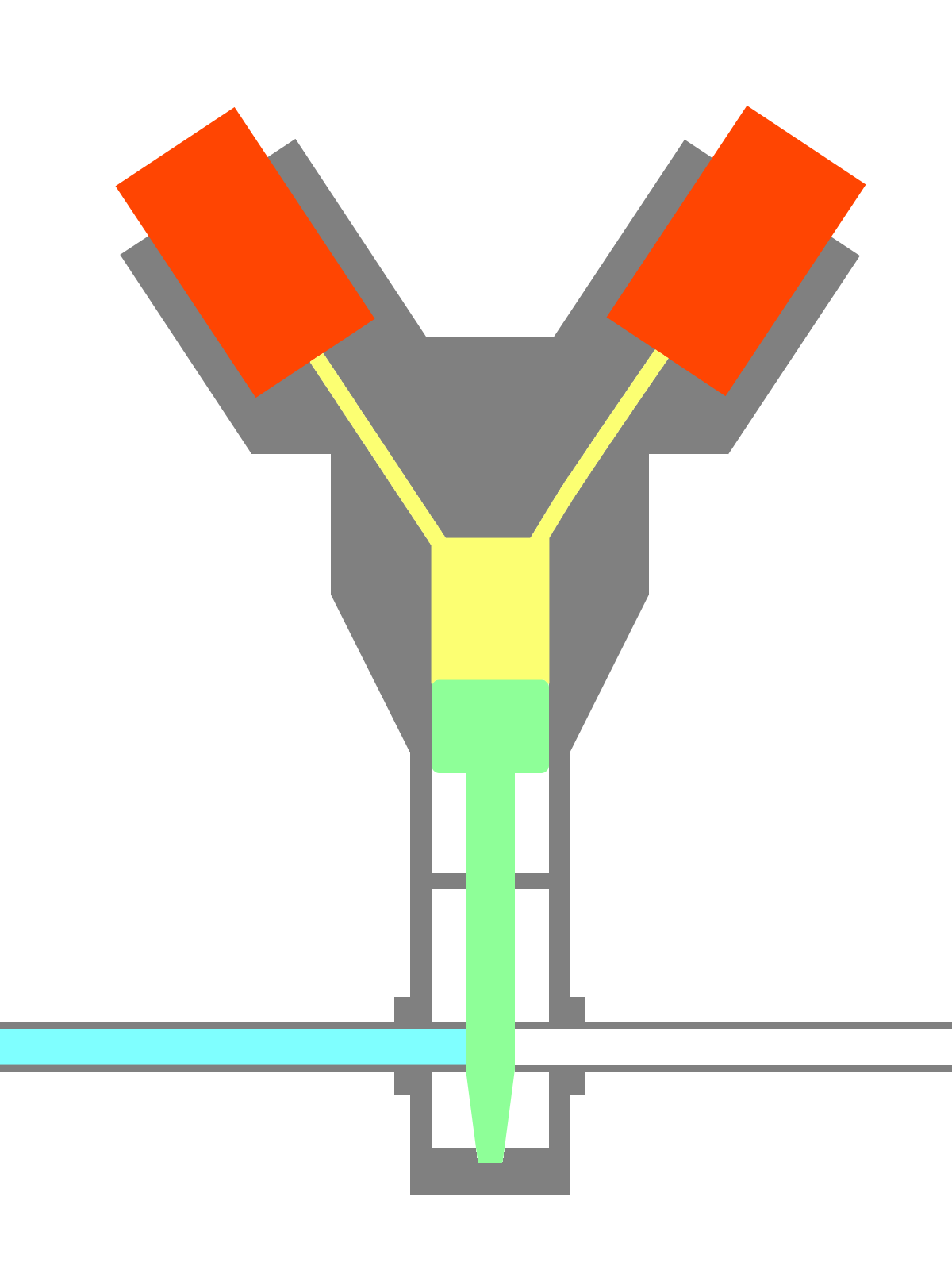
Normally open pyrovalve after activation. The piston has cut off the flow.

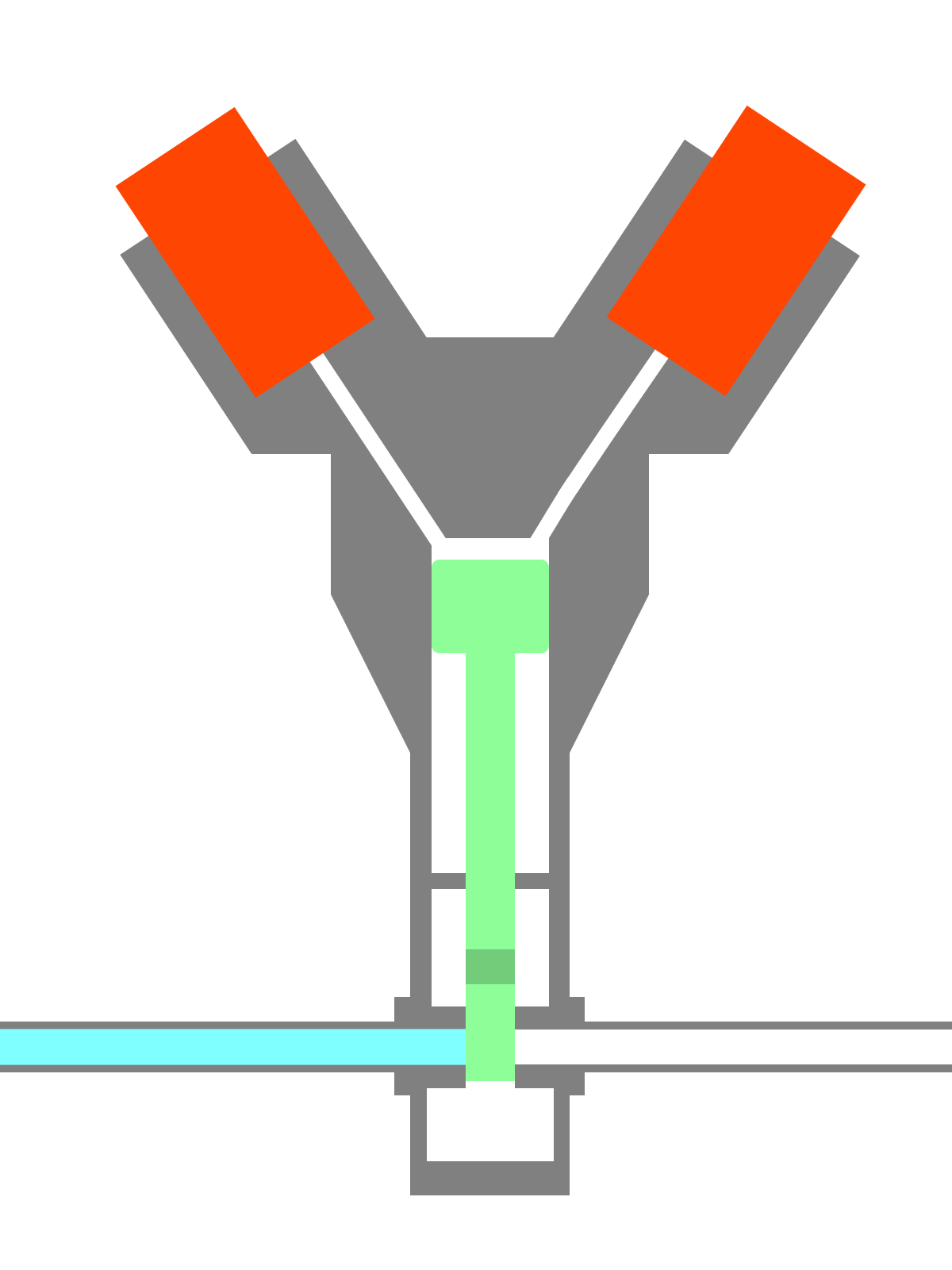
Normally closed pyrovalve before activation. The fluid is blocked.

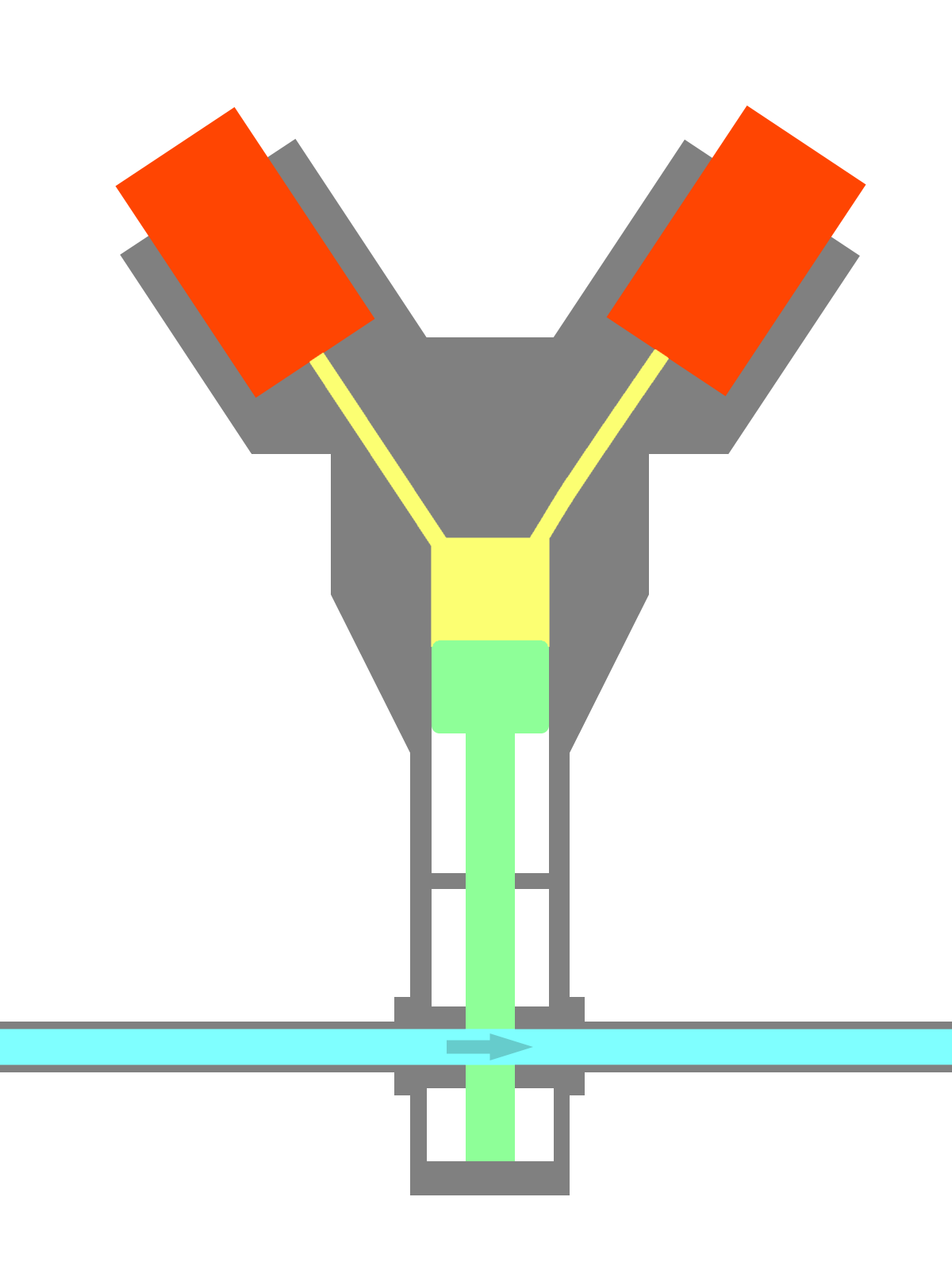
Normally closed pyrovalve after activation. The fluid can now flow.

== Examples ==
- Eight pyrovalves controlled the descent of the Perseverance Mars rover after seven months of flight.
