= NVS-02 =

Indian navigation satellite

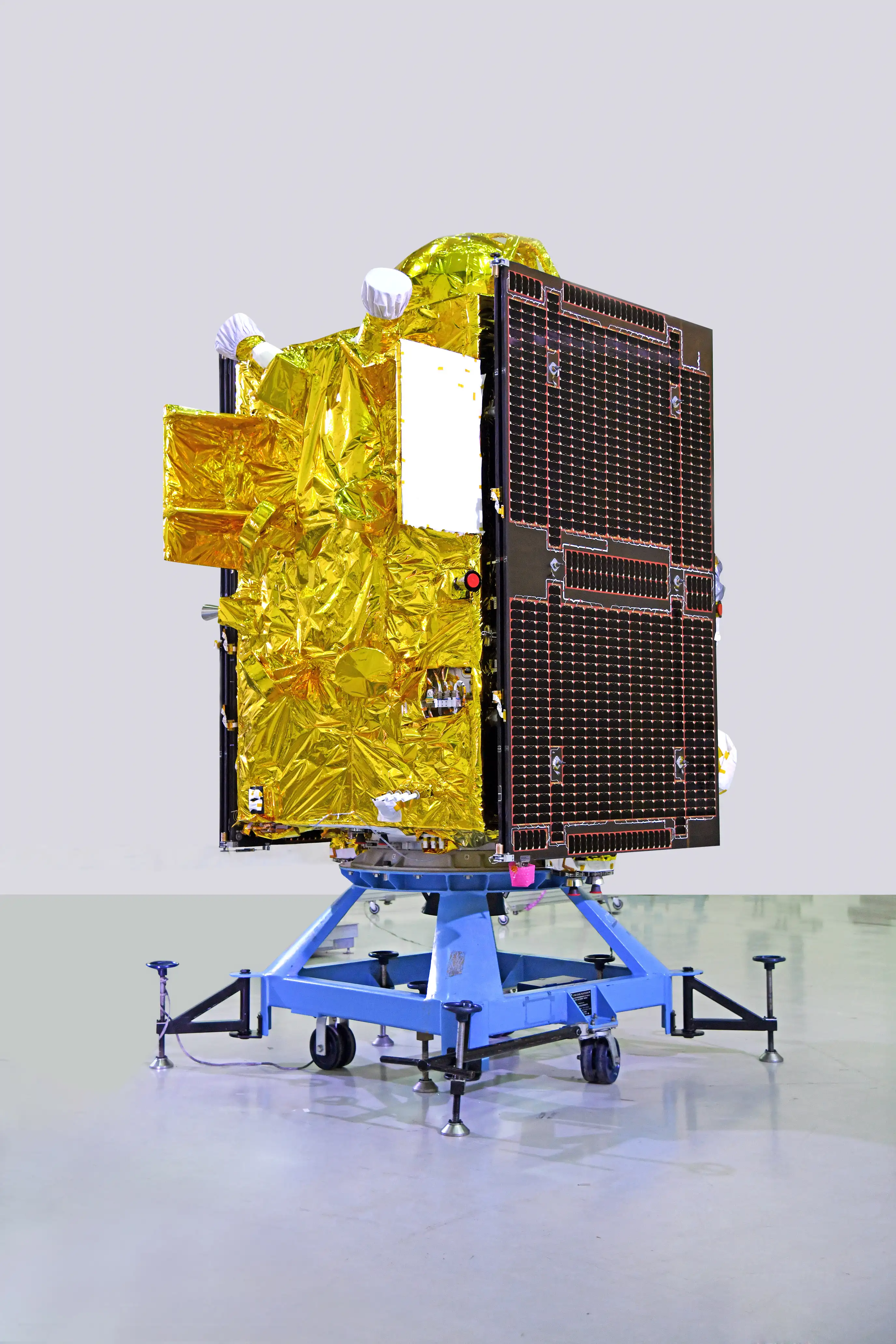
- NVS series spacecraft
- Mission type: Navigation
- Operator: ISRO
- COSPAR ID: 2025-020A
- SATCAT no.: 62850

Spacecraft properties
- Bus: I-2K
- Manufacturer: ISRO Satellite Centre; Space Applications Centre
- Launch mass: 2250 kg
- Power: 3 kW

Start of mission
- Launch date: 29 January 2025, 06:23 IST
- Rocket: GSLV-F15
- Launch site: Satish Dhawan, SLP
- Contractor: ISRO

Orbital parameters
- Reference system: Geocentric
- Regime: GTO
- Longitude: 111.75° East (planned)
- Perigee altitude: 165 km (103 mi)
- Apogee altitude: 36,577 km (22,728 mi)

NVS-02 is the second satellite in the NVS series and the eleventh satellite in the Indian Regional Navigation Satellite System (IRNSS), with an alternate name of IRNSS-1K, equipped with navigation payloads in L1, L5, and S bands, as well as a ranging payload in C-band. The vehicle is based on the conventional I-2K bus platform, with a lift-off mass of 2250 kg and a power handling capacity of approximately 3 kW. It was planned to replace IRNSS-1E at the orbital slot of 111.75° East.

== Description ==
NVS-02, the second satellite in the NVS series is configured with Navigation payload in L1, L5 and S bands in addition to ranging payload in C-band like its predecessor-NVS-01.It was planned to provide two types of services, namely, Standard Positioning Service (SPS) and Restricted Service (RS). SPS provides a position accuracy of better than 20 m (2σ) and timing accuracy better than 40 ns (2σ) over the primary service Area.

NVS-02 satellite was designed, developed and integrated at U R Rao Satellite Centre (URSC) with the support of other satellite-based work Centres. On completion of Assembly and Integrated Testing (AIT), the satellite was subjected to satellite level thermovac test to verify and validate its design and performance in simulated space environment during November-December 2024. The satellite underwent dynamic test during December 2024 thus confirming its suitability to withstand the dynamic loads anticipated during launch.

A comprehensive Pre-shipment Review (PSR) of the performance and compliance of the Satellite during various phases of its realization was completed on 27 December 2024. The satellite was flagged off to SDSC-SHAR on 5 January 2025.

== History ==
=== Launch ===
NVS-02 was launched aboard GSLV-F15.The rocket lifted off from the spaceport’s second launch pad at 6.23 a.m. on 29 January 2025, marking ISRO's first launch of the year and the 17th flight of the GSLV and the 11th flight of Mk2 Variant. The satellite was injected into the GTO 19 minutes after launch from Sriharikota. This marked ISRO's 100th spaceflight launch from Satish Dhawan Space Center.

=== Fuel system failure ===
Following launch, ISRO reported that orbit raising operations towards positioning the satellite to the designated orbital slot could not be carried out as the valves for admitting the oxidizer fuel for the main engine did not open. From this point, the spacecraft was determined to not be able to complete its mission objectives. The spacecraft is currently still in a Geostationary transfer orbit with a perigee of about 165 kilometres (103 mi) and an apogee of around 36,577 kilometres (22,728 mi). All other systems are reported to be working normally.

=== Analysis ===
ISRO has formed a Failure Analysis committee headed by former Chairman A S Kiran Kumar to look into the causes for the failure of the pyro valve in the spacecraft.The committee had determined the fault following a thorough investigation and presented the Failure Analysis Report to the Indian Government in October 2025. The initial public report, as underlined by an ISRO press statement on 25 February 2026 concluded that the prime reason for flight failure was due to the ignition signal not reaching the pyro valve of the oxidizer line for the main engine, meant for orbit raising manoeuvres. The committee concluded that the most likely cause was the disengagement of a contact in both the main and redundant valves of the fuel connectors. Similar deficiencies were identified and fixed prior to the launch of CMS-03, which validated the newly built fixes with a more redundant system. The spacecraft remains in orbit.

== See also ==
- Communication-Centric Intelligence Satellite (CCI-Sat)
- GPS-aided geo-augmented navigation (GAGAN)
- Satellite navigation
