= Cartosat =

Indian Earth observation satellite series

- Manufacturer: ISRO
- Country of origin: India
- Operator: NTRO
- Applications: Optical Earth observation

Specifications
- Bus: IRS
- Launch mass: 700–1,600 kg (1,500–3,500 lb)
- Power: 0.9-1.1 kW
- Batteries: Solar
- Equipment: Panchromatic cameras
- Regime: SSO

Production
- Status: Operational
- Launched: 9
- Operational: 7
- Maiden launch: Cartosat-1 (2005)
- Last launch: Cartosat-3 (2019)

The Cartosat is a series of Indian optical Earth observation satellites built and operated by the Indian Space Research Organisation (ISRO). The Cartosat series is a part of the Indian Remote Sensing Program. They are used for Earth's resource management, defence services and monitoring.

== History ==
The Department of Space (DoS) had launched and managed the IRS series of remote sensing satellites for Earth's resource management and monitoring. These satellites were very successful in providing data in various scales ranging from 1:1 Million to 1:12,500 scale. Each of the IRS missions ensured data continuity while introducing improvements in the spatial, spectral and radiometric resolutions. Considering increased demand for large scale and topographic mapping data, the DoS launched the expanded Cartosat series of remote sensing satellites. The first satellite of the series, Cartosat-1, was launched in 2005.

== Satellites ==
=== Cartosat-1 ===
Cartosat-1 was launched by PSLV-C6 on 5 May 2005 from Satish Dhawan Space Centre's SLP at Sriharikota. Images from the satellite are available from GeoEye for worldwide distribution. The satellite covers the entire globe in 1867 orbits on a 126-day cycle. It carries two state-of-the-art panchromatic (PAN) cameras that take black and white stereoscopic pictures of the earth in the visible region of the electromagnetic spectrum. The two cameras with 2.5 metres (8 ft 2 in) spatial resolution, acquire two images simultaneously, one forward looking (FORE) at +26 degrees and one aft of the satellite at −5 degrees for near instantaneous stereo data. The time difference between the acquisitions of the same scene by the two cameras is about 52 seconds.

=== Cartosat-2 ===
Cartosat-2 was launched by PSLV-C7 on 10 January 2007 from Satish Dhawan Space Centre's FLP at Sriharikota. Cartosat-2 carries a state-of-the-art panchromatic (PAN) camera that take black and white pictures of the Earth in the visible region of the electromagnetic spectrum. The swath covered by this high resolution PAN camera is 9.6 kilometres (6.0 mi) and their spatial resolution is less than 1 metre (3 ft 3 in). The satellite can be steered up to 45 degrees along as well as across the track. Cartosat-2 is an advanced remote sensing satellite capable of providing scene-specific spot imagery. The data from the satellite is used for detailed mapping and other cartographic applications at cad-astral level, urban and rural infrastructure development and management, as well as applications in Land Information System (LIS) and Geographical Information System (GIS).

=== Cartosat-2A ===
Cartosat-2A was launched by PSLV-C9 on 28 April 2008 from Satish Dhawan Space Centre in Sriharikota along with nine other satellites. It is a dedicated satellite for the Indian Armed Forces which is in the process of establishing an Aerospace Command. The satellite carries a panchromatic (PAN) camera capable of taking black-and-white pictures in the visible region of electromagnetic spectrum. The highly agile Cartosat-2A can be steered up to 45 degrees along as well as across the direction of its movement to facilitate imaging of any area more frequently.

=== Cartosat-2B ===
Cartosat-2B was launched by PSLV-C15 on 12 July 2010 from Sriharikota. The satellite carries a panchromatic (PAN) camera capable of taking black-and-white pictures in the visible region of electromagnetic spectrum. The highly agile CARTOSAT-2B can be steered up to 26 degrees along as well as across the direction of its movement to facilitate imaging of any area more frequently.

=== Cartosat-2C ===
Cartosat-2C has a lower resolution of 25 centimetres (9.8 in). It uses 1.2 metres (3 ft 11 in) optics with 60% of weight removal compared to Cartosat-2. Other features include the use of adaptive optics, acousto optical devices, in-orbit focusing using MEMs and large area-light weight mirrors. The satellite was to be launched on board PSLV C-34 during 2014, but was delayed and finally launched on 22 June 2016. Its uses include weather mapping, cartography, and strategic applications.

=== Cartosat-2D ===
Cartosat-2D was launched by PSLV-C37 on 15 February 2017 from Satish Dhawan Space Centre.

=== Cartosat-2E ===
Cartosat-2E was launched by PSLV-C38 on 23 June 2017. The PSLV-C38 rocket launched the 712-kilogram (1,570 lb) satellite along with 30 other nano satellites.

=== Cartosat-2F ===
Cartosat-2F was launched successfully by PSLV-C40 on 12 January 2018. The PSLV-C40 rocket launched the 710 kilograms (1,570 lb) satellite, the seventh of the Cartosat-2 series, along with 30 other nano satellites from India, Canada, Finland, France, Republic of Korea, UK and the USA.

=== Cartosat-3 ===
Cartosat-3 was launched on 27 November 2019 by PSLV-C47 rocket along with 13 other cubesats from USA. It has a panchromatic resolution of 0.25 metres (9.8 in) making it the imaging satellite with highest resolution and Mx of 1 metre (3 ft 3 in) with a high quality resolution which is a major improvement from the previous payloads in the Cartosat series.

== Launch Schedule ==
Designation	Resolution (in meters)	COSPAR ID	NORAD ID	Power	Launch date, Time (UTC)	Launch mass	Launch vehicle	Launch site	Remarks
Cartosat-1/IRS-P5	2.5	2005-017A	28649	1100 W	5 May 2005, 04:44	1,560 kg (3,440 lb)	PSLV-G C6	SLP, SDSC	First satellite in the series.
Cartosat-2/IRS-P7	< 1	2007-001B	29710	900 W	10 January 2007, 03:57	680 kg (1,500 lb)	PSLV-G C7	FLP, SDSC	Can be steered up to 45 degrees.
Cartosat-2A	Unknown	2008-021A	32783	900 W	28 April 2008, 03:54	690 kg (1,520 lb)	PSLV-CA C9	SLP, SDSC	Dedicated to be used by Indian Armed Forces.
Cartosat-2B		2010-035A	36795	930 W	12 July 2010, 03:52	694 kg (1,530 lb)	PSLV-CA C15	FLP, SDSC	Can be steered 26 degrees along as well as across.
Cartosat-2C	1.2	2016-040A	41599	986 W	22 June 2016, 03:56	727.5 kg (1,604 lb)	PSLV-XL C34	SLP, SDSC	Reduced mass and improved payloads
Cartosat-2D		2017-008A	41948	986 W	15 February 2017, 03:58	712 kg (1,570 lb)	PSLV-XL C37	FLP, SDSC	
Cartosat-2E		2017-036C	42767	986 W	23 June 2017, 03:59	712 kg (1,570 lb)	PSLV-XL C38	FLP, SDSC	
Cartosat-2F		2018-004A	43111	986 W	12 January 2018, 03:59	710 kg (1,570 lb)	PSLV-XL C40	FLP, SDSC	
Cartosat-3	0.25	2019-081A	44804	2000 W	27 November 2019, 03:58	1,625 kg (3,583 lb)	PSLV-XL C47	SLP, SDSC	Indian satellite with highest resolution in the world today, high quality imaging at 1 metre resolution
Cartosat-3A (EOS-08)					2024–25		PSLV-XL		
Cartosat-3B					2024–25		PSLV-XL		

== See also ==
- Indian Remote Sensing Programme
- List of Indian satellites
- Information Gathering Satellite
