= Microsat (ISRO) =

Indian Earth observation satellite

Microsat-TD
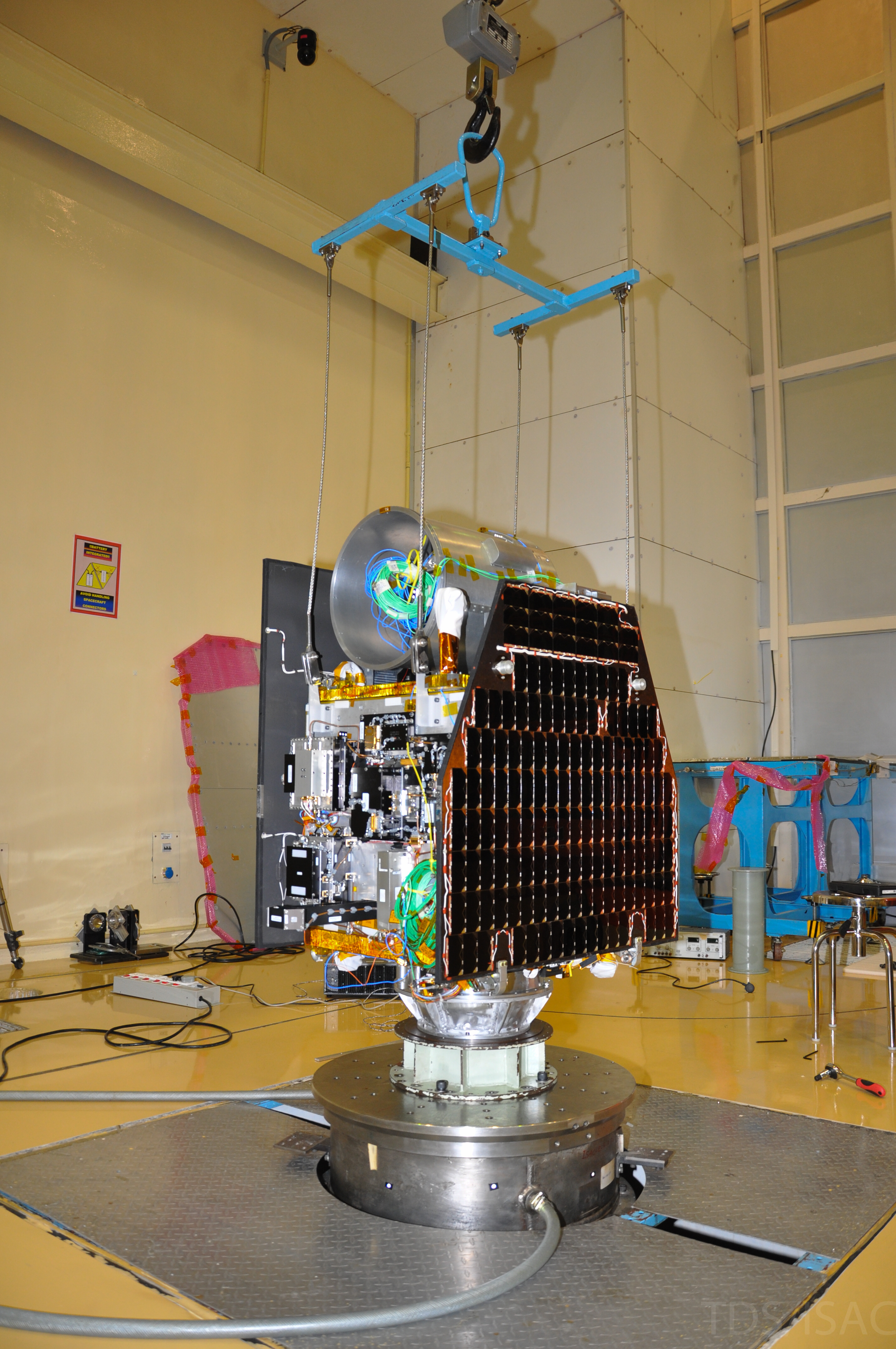
- Earth observation satellite Microsat-TD during pre-launch tests
- Operator: ISRO
- COSPAR ID: 2018-004T
- SATCAT no.: 43128
- Mission duration: Planned: 10 months Duration: 2 years, 10 months, 15 days

Spacecraft properties
- Bus: IMS-1
- Manufacturer: ISRO
- Launch mass: 133.2 kilograms (294 lb)

Start of mission
- Launch date: 12 January 2018
- Rocket: PSLV-C40
- Launch site: Satish Dhawan Space Centre (Sriharikota)

End of mission
- Disposal: Orbital decay
- Decay date: 27 November 2020

Orbital parameters
- Reference system: Geocentric
- Regime: Sun-synchronous orbit
- Periapsis altitude: 350 km (220 mi)
- Apoapsis altitude: 350 km (220 mi)
- Inclination: 96.87°
- Period: 91.5 minutes

Microsat-TD was an Earth observing satellite developed by ISRO. Its launch marked India's 100 satellites in space. This satellite could capture images at night by imaging in infrared spectrum.

== Launch ==
MICROSAT-TD satellite was launched at 0359 UTC on 12 January 2018 by PSLV-C40 and its deployment profile was previously rehearsed on PSLV-C38 mission. Microsat-TD was launched along with Cartosat-2F, INS-1C and 28 satellites from 6 countries and separated 1 hour 45 minutes after first stage ignition. Duration of PSLV C40 mission was 2 hours and 21 minutes, making it the longest mission of PSLV at that time.

== Payload ==
Microsat-TD was IMS-1 based technology demonstrator carrying optical imaging payload in two bands.

- 0.8 meter resolution (panchromatic, 0.5 -0.85 μm) with 3.2 km swath
- 6 meter resolution (IR, 3.7-4.8 μm and 8-12 μm) with 2 km swath

== End of mission ==
To reduce its orbital stay, Microsat-TD was de-orbited while depleting its left over propellant near the end of its life. Satellite reentered within a month, on 27 November 2020.

== See also ==
- Microsat-R
