= Cartosat-3 =

Indian earth observation satellite

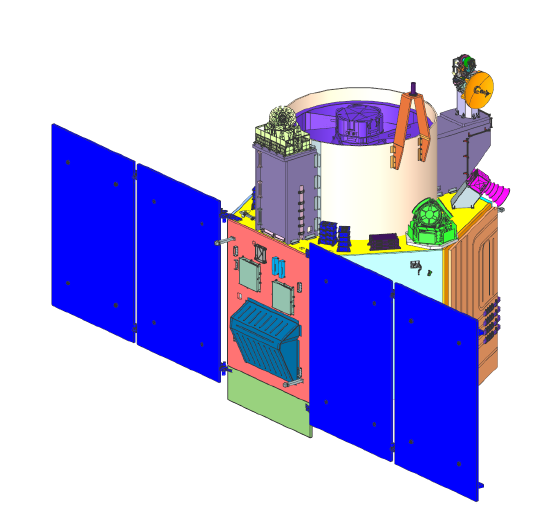
- Render of Cartosat-3 satellite in deployed configuration
- Names: CartoSat-3
- Mission type: Earth Observation
- Operator: ISRO
- COSPAR ID: 2019-081A
- SATCAT no.: 44804
- Website: https://www.isro.gov.in/
- Mission duration: 5 years (planned); 6 years, 9 months and 30 days (in progress)

Spacecraft properties
- Spacecraft: CartoSat-3
- Bus: IRS-2
- Manufacturer: Indian Space Research Organisation
- Launch mass: 1,625 kg (3,583 lb)
- Power: 2000 watts

Start of mission
- Launch date: 27 November 2019, 03:58 UTC
- Rocket: Polar Satellite Launch Vehicle-XL, PSLV-C47
- Launch site: Satish Dhawan Space Centre, Second Launch Pad (SLP)
- Contractor: Indian Space Research Organisation
- Entered service: 24 February 2020

Orbital parameters
- Reference system: Geocentric orbit
- Regime: Sun-synchronous orbit
- Periapsis altitude: 450 km (280 mi)
- Apoapsis altitude: 450 km (280 mi)
- Inclination: 97.5°
- Period: 100.0 minutes

Instruments
- Panchromatic Camera (PAN); Multispectral VNIR (MX)

Cartosat-3 is an advanced Indian Earth observation satellite built and developed by Indian Space Research Organisation (ISRO), which replaces the Indian Remote Sensing Satellite (IRS) series. It has a panchromatic resolution of 0.25 metres making it one of the imaging satellite with highest resolution in the world at the time of launch and MX of 1 metre with a high quality resolution which is a major improvement from the previous payloads in the Cartosat series.

Potential uses include weather mapping, cartography or defence, and strategic applications.

== Overview ==
Cartosat-3 has a resolution of 25 cm (10"). It uses 1.2 m optics with 60% of weight removal compared to Cartosat-2. Other features include the use of adaptive optics, acousto optical devices, in-orbit focusing using MEMs and large area-light weight mirrors and advanced sense with a high quality resolution. It has a planned mission life of 5 years. Approved cost of Cartosat-3 is ₹351.16 crore (US$36 million). It captures Panchromatic and Multispectral images with spectral bandwidth from 0.45 - 0.9 μm which includes visible blue (0.45 - 0.52 μm), visible green (0.52 - 0.59 μm), visible red (0.62 - 0.68 μm) and near IR (0.77 - 0.86 μm).

== History ==
Cartosat-3 is the 3rd generation of high-resolution imaging satellites developed by ISRO. It was developed in response to increased demand for imaging services to address urban planning, rural resource and infrastructure development needs.

== Launch ==
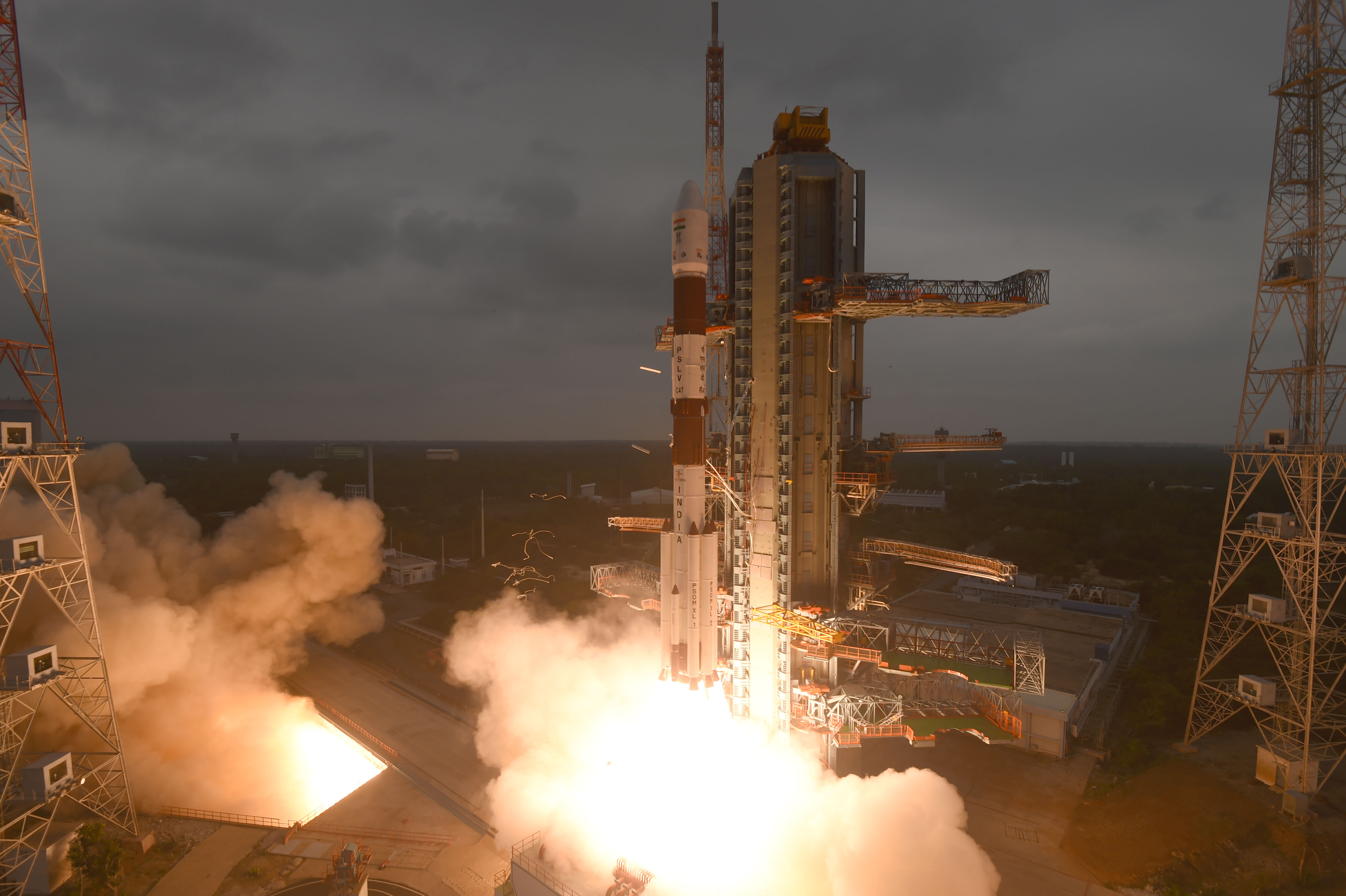
PSLV-C47 lifting off from Second Launch Pad (SLP) with Cartosat-3.

PSLV-C47 carrying Cartosat-3 was launched on 27 November 2019 at 03:58 UTC using XL variant of Polar Satellite Launch Vehicle from the Second Launch Pad (SLP) of Satish Dhawan Space Centre into a Sun-synchronous orbit of 450 kilometers. Thirteen commercial ride-sharing 3U cubesats including twelve SuperDoves (Flock-4p) by Planet Labs and one Meshbed by Analytical Space of United States were also put in orbit using the same launch vehicle. Commercial ride-share was arranged by NewSpace India Limited, Spaceflight Industries and ISILaunch.

== See also ==
- Cartosat-1
- Cartosat-2
- Cartosat-2A
- Cartosat-2B
- Cartosat-2C
- Cartosat-2D
- Cartosat-2E
- Cartosat-2F
