= InflateSail =

Solar sail technology demonstration CubeSat

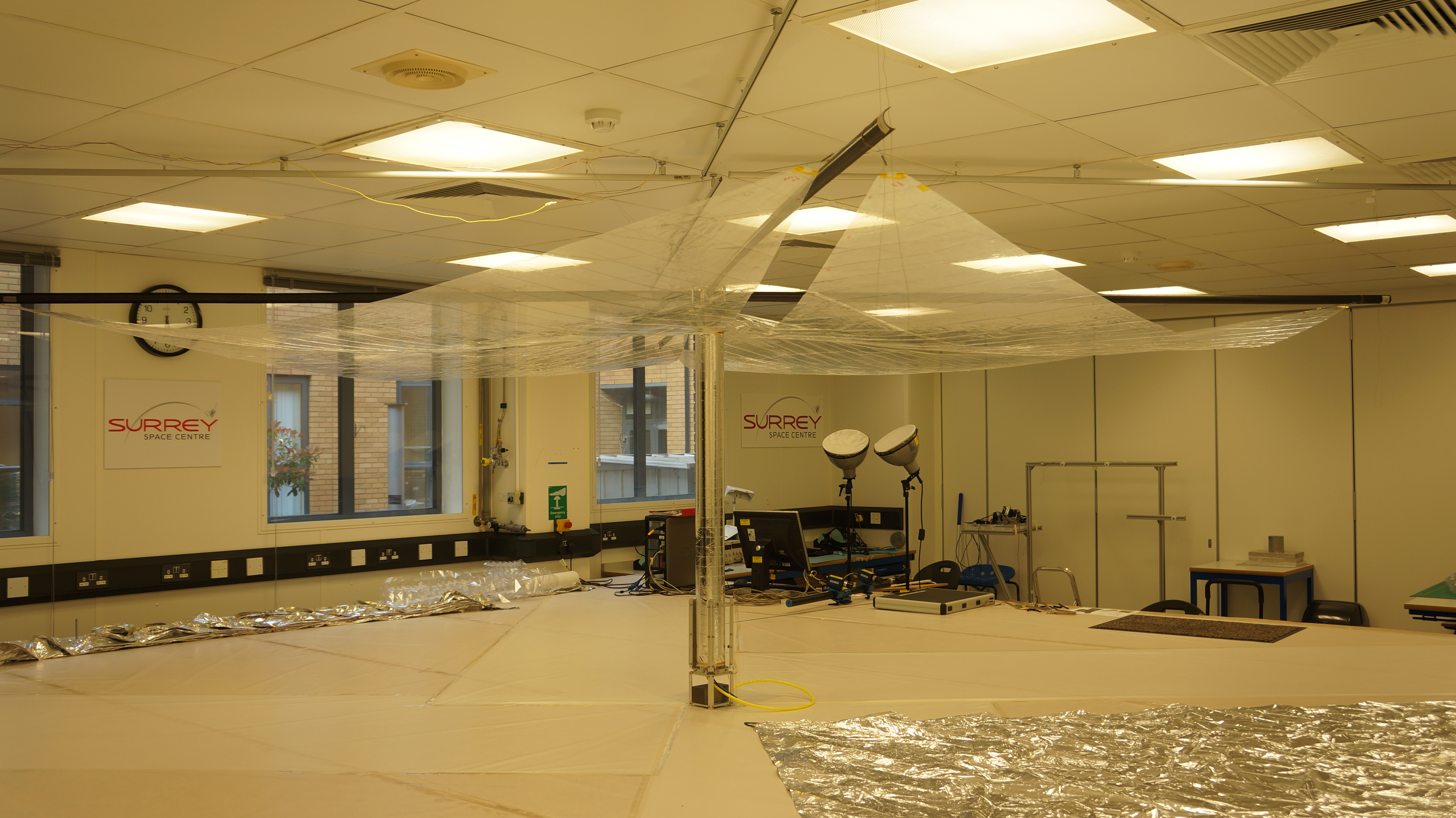
- InflateSail Engineering Model in deployed configuration
- Mission type: Technology
- Operator: von Karman Institute for Fluid Dynamics
- COSPAR ID: 2017-036F
- SATCAT no.: 42770

Spacecraft properties
- Spacecraft type: 3U CubeSat
- Manufacturer: Surrey Space Centre
- Launch mass: 3.2 kilograms (7.1 lb)

Start of mission
- Launch date: 23 June 2017, 03:59 UTC
- Rocket: PSLV-C38
- Launch site: Satish Dhawan Space Centre
- Deployment date: 23 June 2017, 04:22 UTC

End of mission
- Decay date: 3 September 2017

Orbital parameters
- Reference system: Geocentric
- Regime: Low Earth
- Perigee altitude: 397 kilometers (247 mi)
- Apogee altitude: 408 kilometers (254 mi)
- Inclination: 97.4408 degrees
- Period: 92.6 minutes
- Epoch: 29 August 2017 03:26:51 UTC

InflateSail was a 3U CubeSat launched on PSLV C38 on 23 June 2017 into a 505 km (314 mi) polar Sun-synchronous orbit. It carried a 1 m-long (3.3 ft) inflatable rigidizable mast, and a 10 m^{2} (110 sq ft) drag-deorbiting sail. Its primary aim was to demonstrate the effectiveness of drag-based deorbiting from low Earth orbit (LEO). Built by Surrey Space Centre of the University of Surrey, it was one of the Technology Demonstrator CubeSats for the QB50 mission. An identical drag sail payload was planned to be included on the RemoveDEBRIS demonstrator.

== Inflatable mast ==
The inflatable mast was deployed first to distance the sail from the main body of the satellite. The inflatable skin was a 3-ply, 45 μm-thick (0.0018 in) metal-polymer laminate which used the same strain rigidization process as the Echo 2 balloon. The inflation gas was stored in two cool gas generators (CGGs). The inflation gas was vented almost immediately after the deployment and rigidization process. Fully folded, the inflatable was just over 6 centimeters (2.4 in) in height.

== Sail structure ==
The 10 m^{2} (110 sq ft) sail was made up of four quadrants of 12 μm-thick (0.00047 in) polyethylene naphthalate, supported by four bistable carbon fiber tape-springs. The structure was similar in format to both NanoSail-D2 and LightSail 2. The deployment of the sail was driven by a brushless DC motor.

== Spacecraft ==
InflateSail included an avionics suite to support the deployable sail payload. The spacecraft was powered by a GOMSpace power system and returned attitude data from the Stellenbosch/Surrey Attitude Determination and Control System.

Communications with ground were executed through the TRXVU Transceiver procured from ISIS, using the UHF band to transmit and the VHF to receive.

Beacon data containing spacecraft parameters were transmitted at 60s intervals at 436.060MHz 1200bd BPSK.

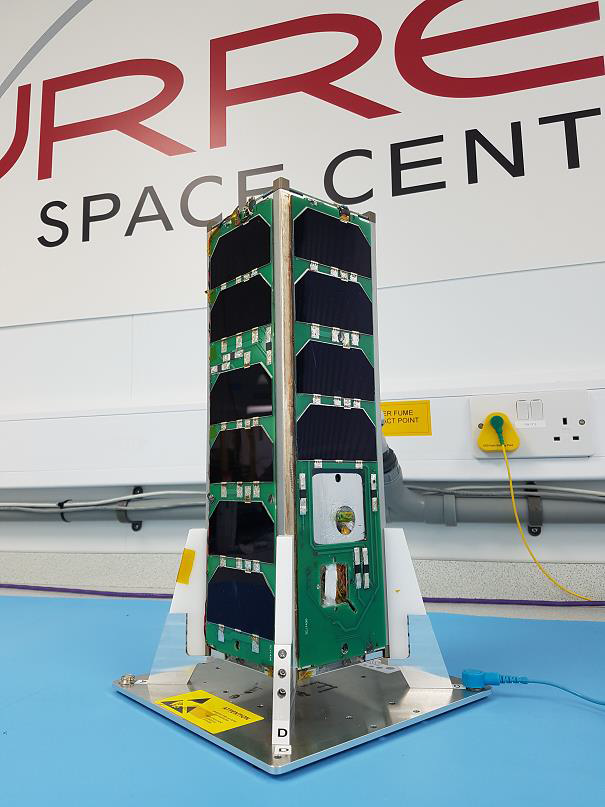
InflateSail CubeSat prior to flight

== Launch ==
InflateSail was launched on board the PSLV-C38 as one of 31 passenger satellites. InflateSail was one of 8 QB50 satellites on this launch. PSLV-C38 lifted off at 09:29 (IST)/03:59 (UTC) on 23 June 2017 from Satish Dhawan Space Centre in India. InflateSail was ejected into a 518x494km orbit approximately 20 minutes after lift off.

== Altitude loss ==
InflateSail successfully deployed its sail approximately one hour after ejection from the launch vehicle and was the first European sail successfully deployed in space. InflateSail rapidly lost altitude and decayed on 3 September 2017 after 72 days in orbit.

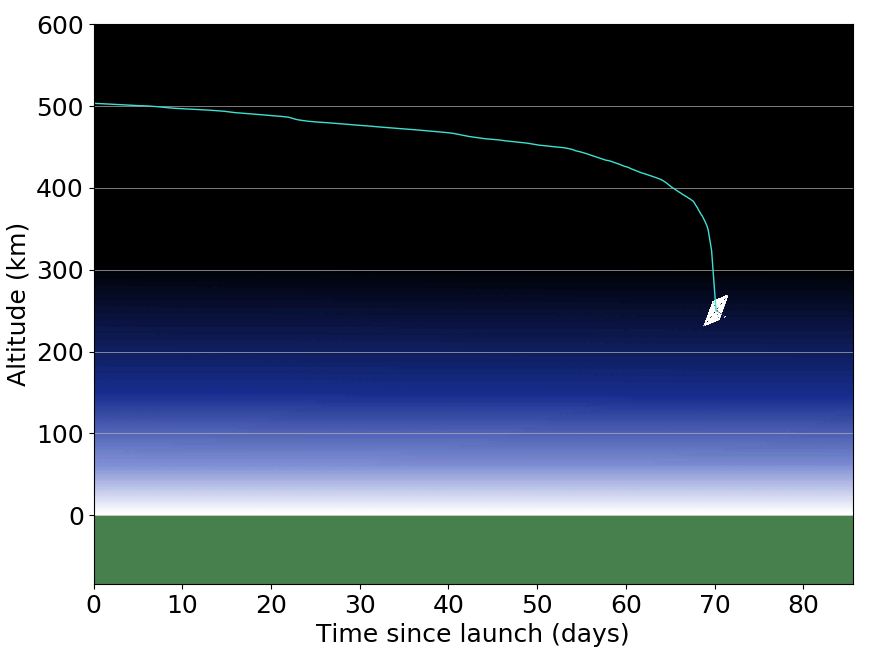
InflateSail average altitude

InflateSail Engineering Model Inflatable

InflateSail Flight Model sail in deployed state

Origami folded inflatable

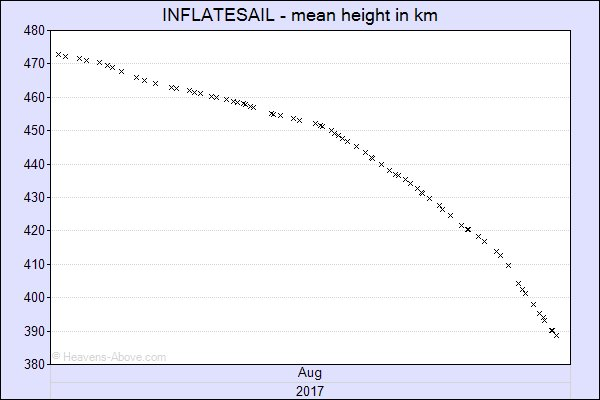
Change in average orbit height during August 2017
