= PSLV-C47 =

Polar satellite launch vehicle mission by ISRO

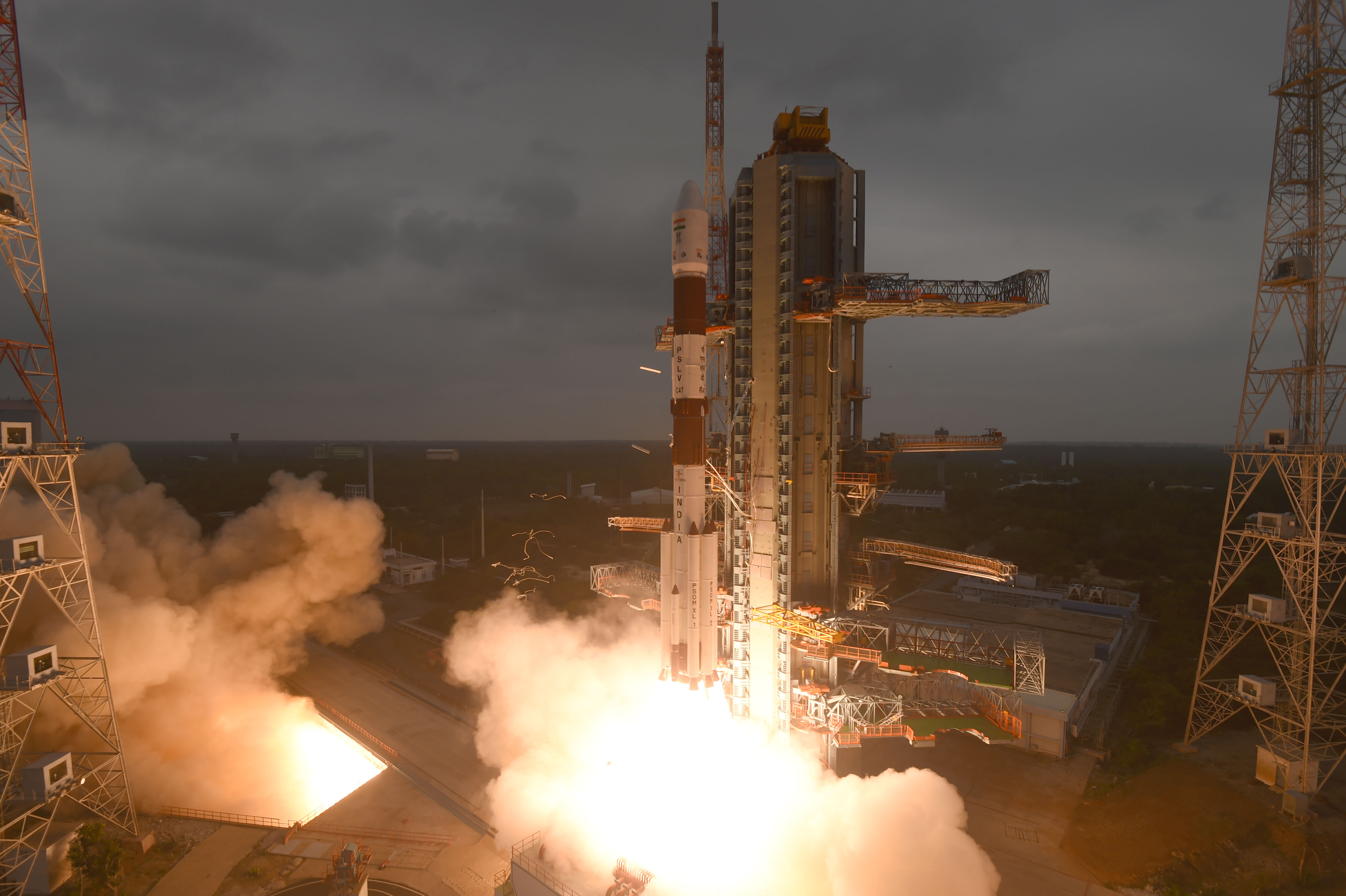

PSLV-XL launch
- Launch: 27 November 2019, 09:27:00 IST
- Operator: ISRO
- Pad: Sriharikota Second
- Payload: Cartosat-3; Meshbed; SuperDoves × 12 (Flock 4p)
- Outcome: Success

PSLV launches

PSLV-C47 was a mission of the Indian Polar Satellite Launch Vehicle (PSLV) rocket, launched on Thursday, November 27, 2019, at 09:27 Hrs (IST) by the Indian Space Research Organisation (ISRO) from the second launch pad of the Satish Dhawan Space Centre at Sriharikota, Andhra Pradesh.

The mission's main payload was Cartosat-3, a mapping satellite. Cartosat-3 was injected into an orbit of 509 km at an inclination of 97.5-degree to the equator, 17 minutes and 38 seconds after lift-off.

== Launch ==
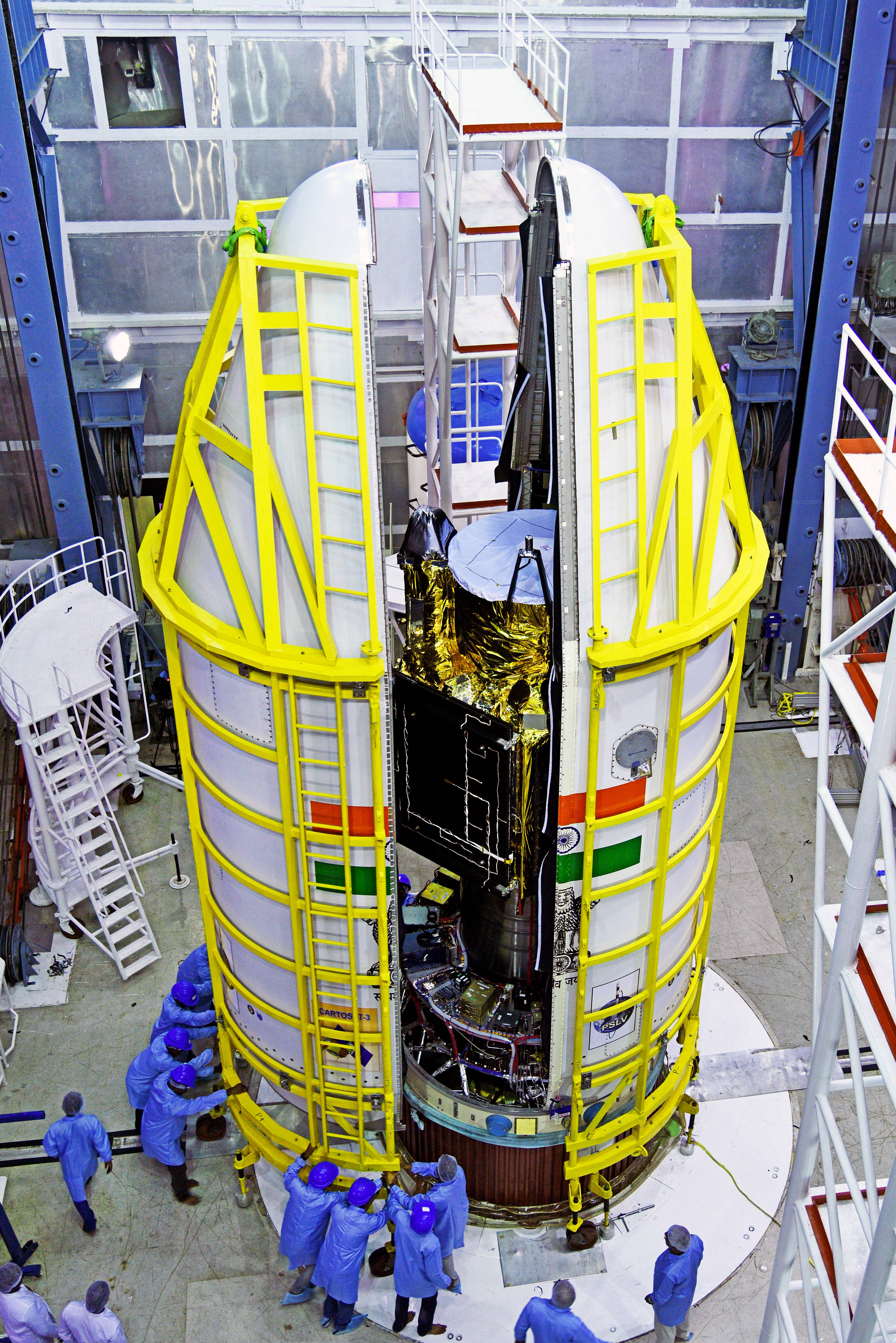
Cartosat-3 payload encapsulation

The mission is the 74th mission from Satish Dhawan Space Centre, 49th flight of PSLV, and 21st flight of the XL variant. The rocket launched from the second launch pad of the Satish Dhawan Space Centre. The first stage burned for around 113 seconds, and then separated. This was followed by the ignition of Second stage, followed by Payload Fairing separation at 156 seconds. The second stage separated at 265 seconds, followed by ignition of third stage which separated at 493 seconds following which the fourth stage ignition began. At 16 minutes and 55 seconds, fourth stage cut off. The Cartosat-3 satellite separated at 17 minutes and 42 seconds at an altitude of 515 km. The first customer satellite separated at 18 minutes and 22 seconds. The last one separated at 26 minutes and 50 seconds, at an altitude of 527 km.

The mission had Vikram 1601 processor, for first time, as navigation computer of launch vehicle. It was made by Semi-Conductor Laboratory. after being test flown in redundant configuration on PSLV C46 mission.

== Payloads ==
Cartosat-3 is an advanced Indian Earth Observation satellite by Indian Space Research Organisation, which replaces the Indian Remote Sensing Satellite series. It's the 9th satellite of the Cartosat series. It has a panchromatic resolution of 0.25 metres making it one of the imaging satellite with highest resolution in the world at the time of launch and MX of 1 metre with a high quality resolution which is a major improvement from the previous payloads in the Cartosat series.

Cartosat-3 shared the ride with 13 commercial 3U CubeSats including twelve SuperDoves (Flock-4p) by Planet Labs and one Meshbed by Analytical Space of United States were also put in orbit using the same launch vehicle. Commercial ride-share was arranged by NewSpace India Limited, Spaceflight Industries and ISILaunch.
