= Cartosat-2F =

Indian earth observation satellite

- CartoSat-2F satellite
- Names: CartoSat-2F; CartoSat-2ER
- Mission type: Earth Observation
- Operator: ISRO
- COSPAR ID: 2018-004A
- SATCAT no.: 43111
- Website: https://www.isro.gov.in/
- Mission duration: 5 years (planned); 8 years and 11 days (in progress)

Spacecraft properties
- Spacecraft: CartoSat-2F
- Bus: IRS-2
- Manufacturer: Indian Space Research Organization
- Launch mass: 710 kg (1,570 lb)
- Power: 986 watts

Start of mission
- Launch date: 12 January 2018, 03:59 UTC
- Rocket: Polar Satellite Launch Vehicle-XL, PSLV-C40
- Launch site: Satish Dhawan Space Centre, First launch Pad (FLP)
- Contractor: Indian Space Research Organisation
- Entered service: 12 April 2018

Orbital parameters
- Reference system: Geocentric orbit
- Regime: Sun-synchronous orbit
- Periapsis altitude: 505 km (314 mi)
- Apoapsis altitude: 505 km (314 mi)
- Inclination: 97.47°
- Period: 94.72 minutes
Instruments
- PAN: Panchromatic Camera
- HRMX: High-Resolution Multi-Spectral radiometer
- EvM: Event Monitoring camera

Cartosat-2F is the eighth satellite in the Cartosat-2 Series. It is an Earth observation satellite launched on the PSLV-C40 mission by the Indian Space Research Organisation (ISRO).

== History ==
Originally, Cartosat-2E was published as the last Cartosat-2 satellite to be launched, as Cartosat-3 Series spacecraft were scheduled to launch in 2018. Cartosat-2F was first listed on launch schedules as Cartosat-2ER, a name possibly indicating it was originally a replica of Cartosat-2E to be used as a spare.

== Satellite description ==
Like other satellites in the series, Cartosat-2F was built on an IRS-2 bus. It uses reaction wheels, magnetorquers, and hydrazine-fueled reaction control thrusters for stability. It has a design service life of five years. Cartosat-2F has three main remote sensing instruments, a panchromatic camera called PAN, a four channel visible/near infrared radiometer called HRMX, and an Event monitoring camera (EvM).

- Panchromatic camera (PAN) is capable of taking panchromatic (black and white) photographs in a selected portion of the visible and near-infrared spectrum (0.50–0.85 μm) at a resolution of 65 cm (26 in).
- High-Resolution Multi-Spectral (HRMX) radiometer is a four-channel radiometer sensitive across the entire visible spectrum and part of the near-infrared spectrum (0.43–0.90 μm) at a resolution of 2 m (6 ft 7 in).
- Event Monitoring camera (EvM) is also capable of capturing minute long video of a fixed spot as well, Event Monitoring camera (EvM) for frequent high-resolution land observation of selected areas.

== Launch ==
The route of the satellite Cartosat-2F. Satellite uses a dogleg maneuver to avoid debris falling over Sri Lanka.

The PSLV-C40 launch was initially placed on hiatus following failures with the nose cone and satellite deployment systems of PSLV-C39, but was cleared to launch once these issues were resolved. It was launched at 03:59 UTC from First Launch Pad at Satish Dhawan Space Centre on 12 January 2018, the third of the series to be launched within a year. After 16 minutes and 37 seconds, Cartosat-2F was separated from the launch vehicle, and the ISRO Telemetry, Tracking and Command Network (ITTCN) took control of the satellite for maneuvers to its desired orbit. The launch also marked the 100th satellite successfully put into orbit by the ISRO.

== Mission ==
The first image returned by the mission, on 15 January 2018; was of Holkar Stadium and the surrounding community in Indore, Madhya Pradesh. The PAN camera is designed to have a spatial resolution less than one meter and a swath width of ten kilometers.

On 27 November 2020, at 01:49 UTC, Cartosat-2F and Russia's Kanopus-V No. 3 spacecraft came very close while in orbit, passing each other at distance of nearly 200 to 450 meters.

During a Solar Storm in May 2024, the Orbit of Cartosat-2F decayed from a normal 35 to 40 meters to 180 meters.The spacecraft used its engines to make up for the fall.
