= PSLV-C39 =

- PSLV rocket
- Mission type: Deployment of IRNSS-1H into sub-GTO
- Operator: ISRO
- Website: ISRO website

Spacecraft properties
- Spacecraft: Polar Satellite Launch Vehicle
- Spacecraft type: Expendable launch vehicle
- Manufacturer: ISRO
- Launch mass: 321 t
- Payload mass: 1425 kg

Start of mission
- Launch date: 19:00, 31 August 2017 (IST)
- Rocket: Polar Satellite Launch Vehicle
- Launch site: Sriharikota Launching Range
- Contractor: ISRO

Payload
- List of Satellites : (India) IRNSS-1H

Polar Satellite Launch Vehicle – C39 was the forty-first flight of the PSLV series of launch vehicles on 31 August 2017. Launched in its XL configuration, the vehicle suffered a rare failure – the first failure after 24 years of operations when the heat shield failed to separate and the payload became trapped inside the heat shield and could not be deployed.

== The mission ==
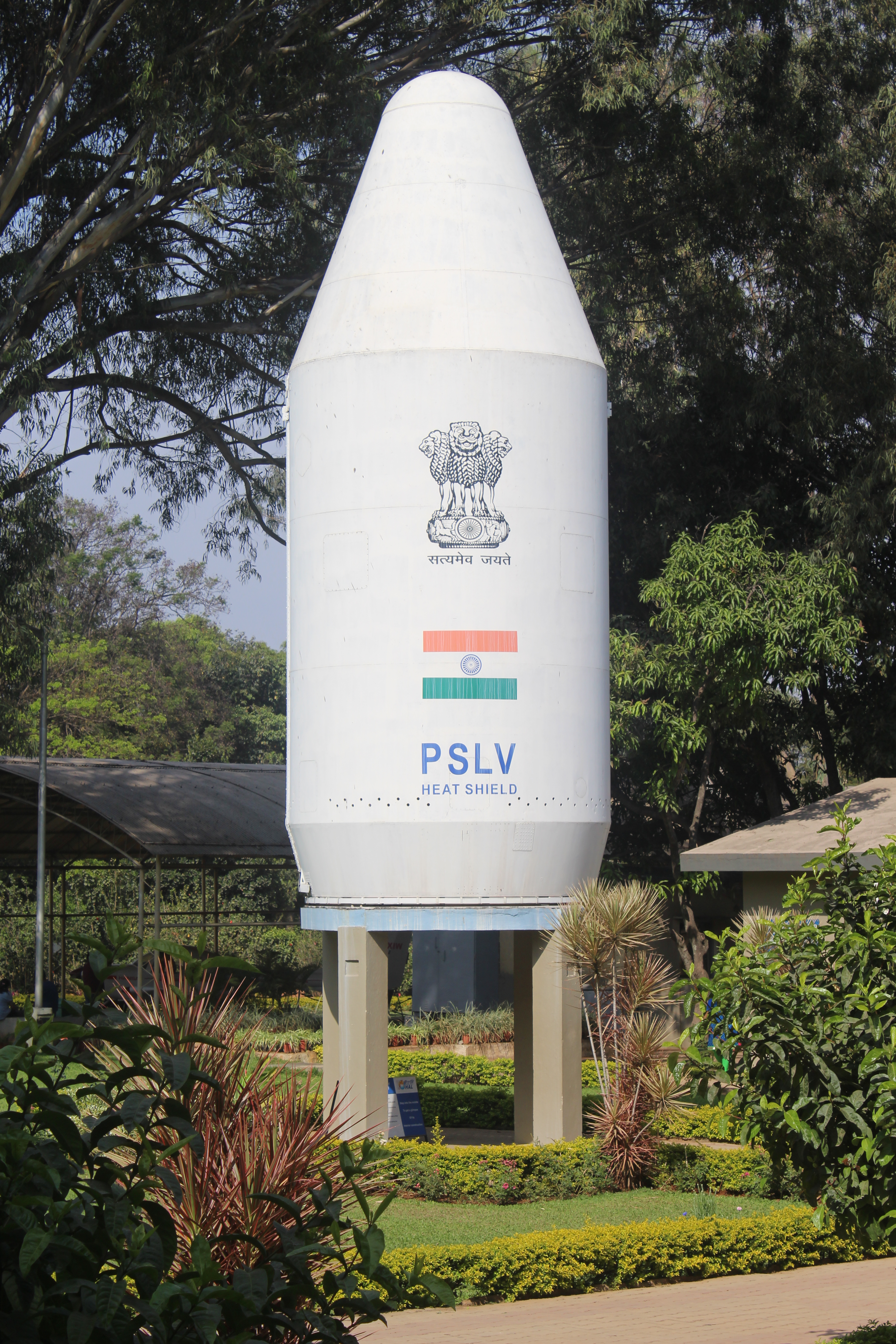
PSLV Heat Shield

PSLV-C39 was supposed to launch the IRNSS-1H, the eighth satellite of the Indian Regional Navigation Satellite System (IRNSS). The launch was necessitated due to the failure of all the Cesium atomic clocks in one of the satellites of the constellation which rendered the navigation system non-operational. The rocket successfully lifted off from the launch pad and performed as expected for about 3 minutes, when the heat shield protecting the satellite during its ascent through the atmosphere was supposed to separate. Due to a malfunction of the pyro devices designed to explosively separate the heat shield, the satellite remained within the heat shield. The satellite stuck within the heat shield with a combined weight of around 2,400 kilograms (5,300 lb) was expected to re-enter and burn up in the Earth's atmosphere in 40 – 60 days, though in reality this only occurred after 548 days on 2 March 2019 around 19:23 UTC near Fiji.

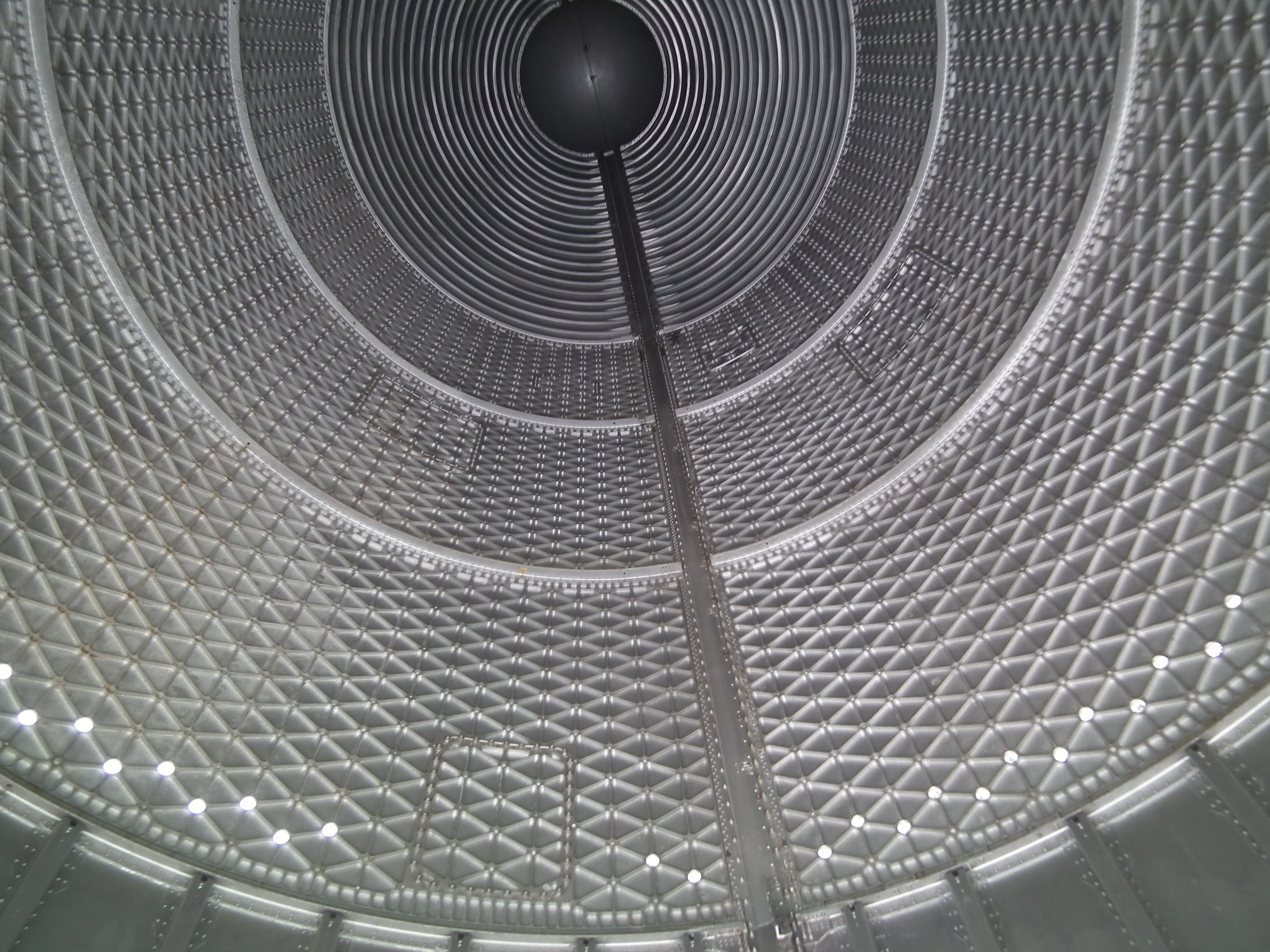
Heat Shield Inside
