= PSLV-C6 =

Indian satellite launch

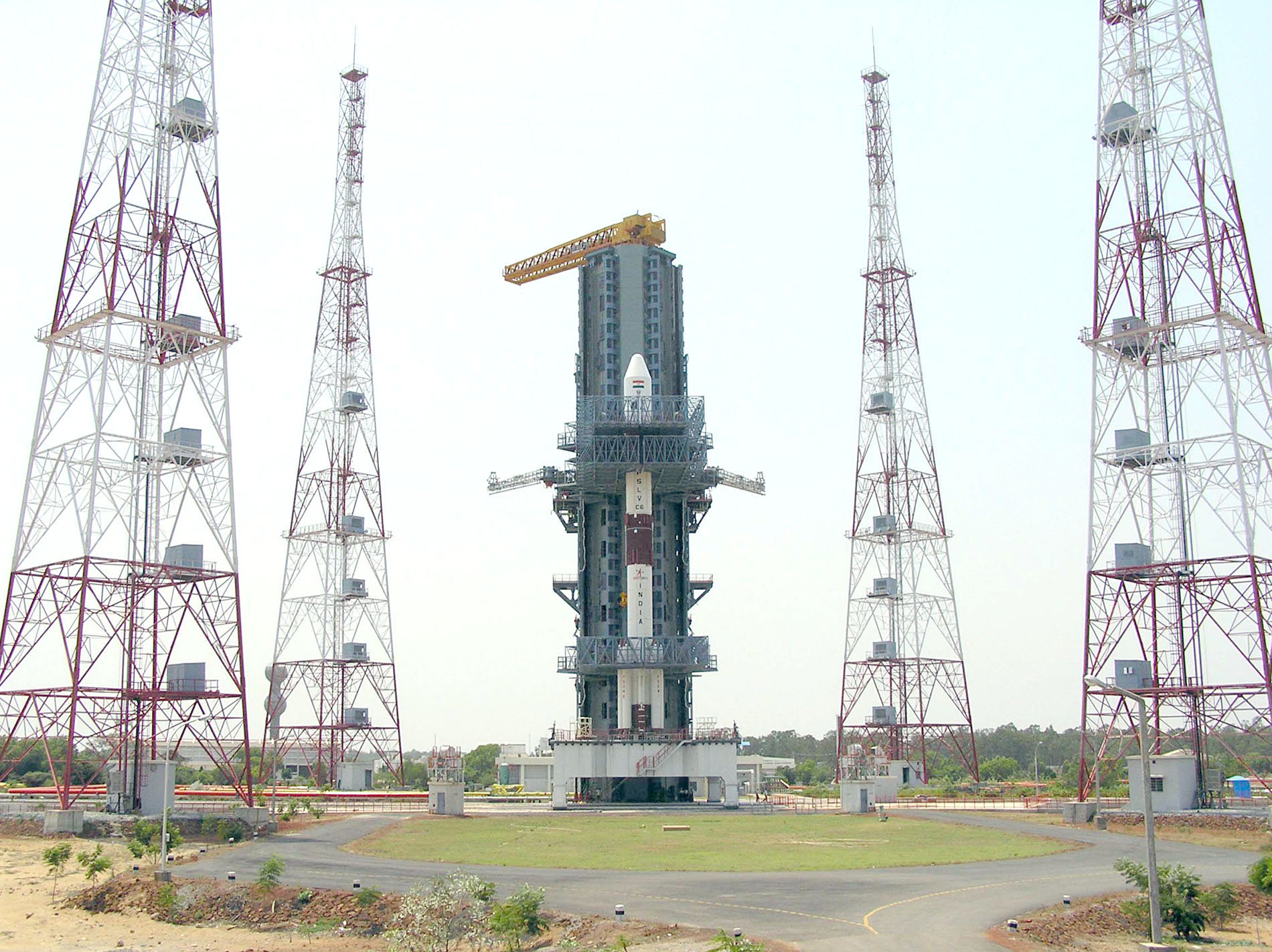
- The PSLV – C6 on its mobile pedestal after having been strapped to launch tower at Sriharikota on 1 May 2005
- Names: HAMSAT mission
- Mission type: Deployment of two satellites.
- Operator: ISRO
- Website: ISRO website
- Mission duration: 1,120 seconds

Spacecraft properties
- Spacecraft: Polar Satellite Launch Vehicle
- Spacecraft type: Expendable launch vehicle
- Manufacturer: ISRO
- Launch mass: 295,980 kilograms (652,520 lb)
- Payload mass: 1,602.5 kilograms (3,533 lb)
- Dimensions: 44.4 metres (146 ft) (overall height)

Start of mission
- Launch date: 04:44, May 5, 2005 (UTC)
- Rocket: Polar Satellite Launch Vehicle
- Launch site: SDSC SLP
- Contractor: ISRO

End of mission
- Disposal: Placed in graveyard orbit
- Deactivated: May 5, 2005

Orbital parameters
- Reference system: Sun-synchronous orbit

Payload
- Cartosat-1; HAMSAT
- Mass: 1,602.5 kilograms (3,533 lb)

PSLV-C6 was the sixth operational launch and overall ninth mission of the PSLV program. This launch was also the fifty-fourth launch by Indian Space Research Organisation since its first mission on 1 January 1962. The vehicle carried and injected India's two satellites; Cartosat-1 (a.k.a. IRS-P5) and HAMSAT into the Sun-synchronous orbit. PSLV-C6 was launched at 04:44 hours Coordinated Universal Time (10:14 hours Indian Standard Time) on 5 May 2005 from the second launch pad of the Satish Dhawan Space Centre.

== Mission highlights ==
- Sixth operational launch of the PSLV program.
- Overall ninth mission of the PSLV program.
- Overall fifty-fourth launch by Indian Space Research Organisation.
- First flight to be launched from the second launch pad of Satish Dhawan Space Centre.
- Carried and injected two satellites built by ISRO.

== Mission parameters ==
- Mass:
  - Total liftoff weight: 295,980 kilograms (652,520 lb)
  - Payload weight: 1,602.5 kilograms (3,533 lb)
- Overall height: 44.4 metres (145.7 ft)
- Propellant:
  - First stage: Solid HTPB based (138.0 + 6 x 9 tonnes)
  - Second stage: Liquid UH 25 + N_{2}O_{4} (41.5 tonnes)
  - Third stage: Solid HTPB based (7.6 tonnes)
  - Fourth stage: Liquid MMH + MON (2.5 tonnes)
- Engine:
  - First stage: Core (PS 1) + 6 strap-on PSOM
  - Second stage: Vikas
  - Third stage: PS 3
  - Fourth stage: PS 4
- Thrust:
  - First stage: 4,762 + 645 x 6 kN
  - Second stage: 800 kN
  - Third stage: 246 kN
  - Fourth stage: 7.3 x 2 kN
- Altitude: 628.535 kilometres (391 mi)
- Maximum velocity:7,546 metres per second (24,757 ft/s) (recorded at time of payload separation)
- Duration: 1,120 seconds

== Payload ==
PSLV-C6 carried and deployed two Indian satellites, Cartosat-1 (a.k.a. IRS-P5) and HAMSAT into the Sun-synchronous orbit. Built by ISRO, Cartosat-1 was a stereoscopic remote sensing satellite and first of the Cartosat series of satellites. HAMSAT was a microsatellite, built for providing satellite based amateur radio satellite to the national as well as the international community of amateur radio operators (HAM).

| Country | Name | Nos | Mass | Type | Objective |
|---|---|---|---|---|---|
| India | IRS-P5 | 1 | 1,560 kg | Satellite | Remote sensing satellite |
| India | HAMSAT | 1 | 42.5 kg | Microsatellite | Amateur radio satellite |

== Launch & planned flight profile ==
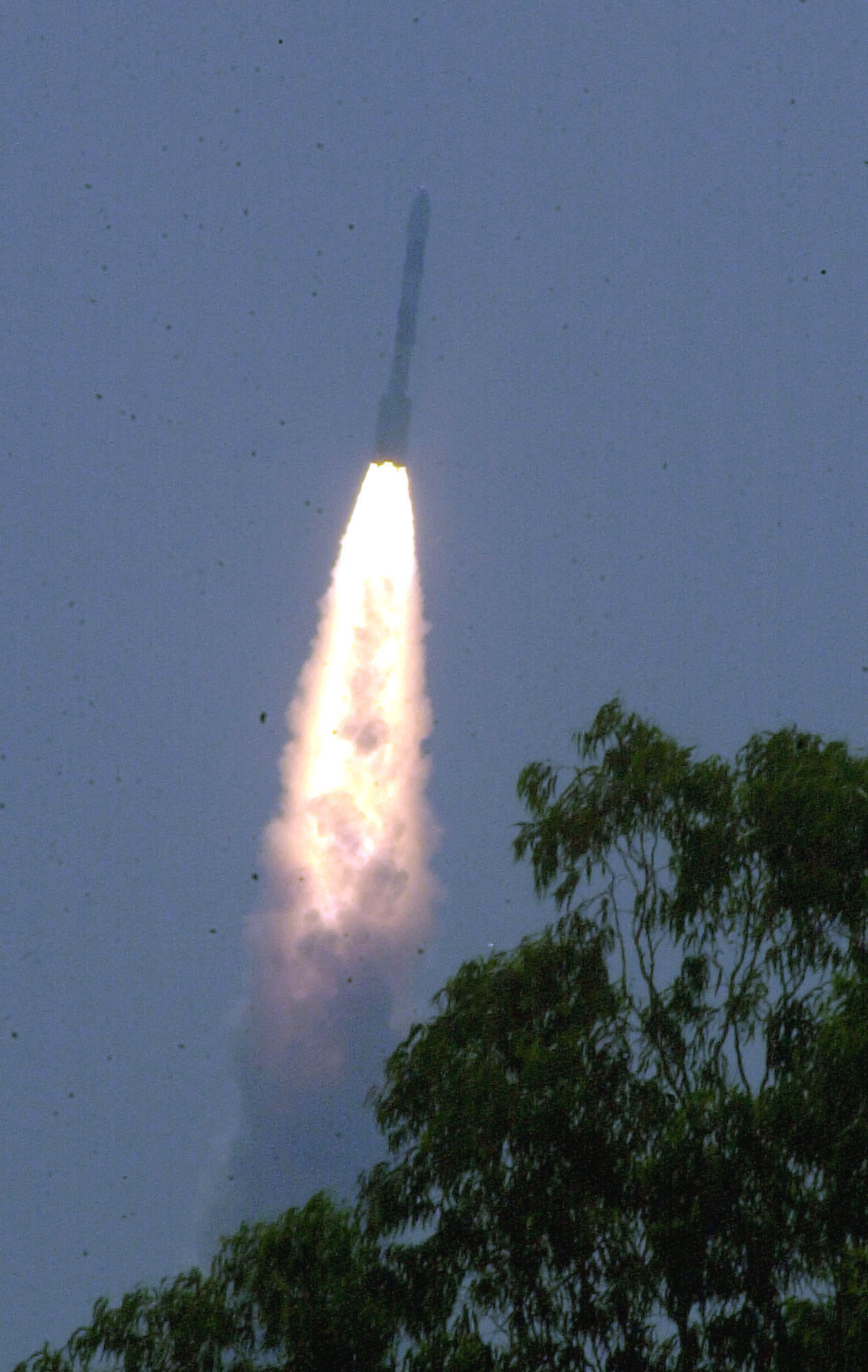
PSLV-C 6 blasting off from launch Tower at Sriharikota on May 5, 2005

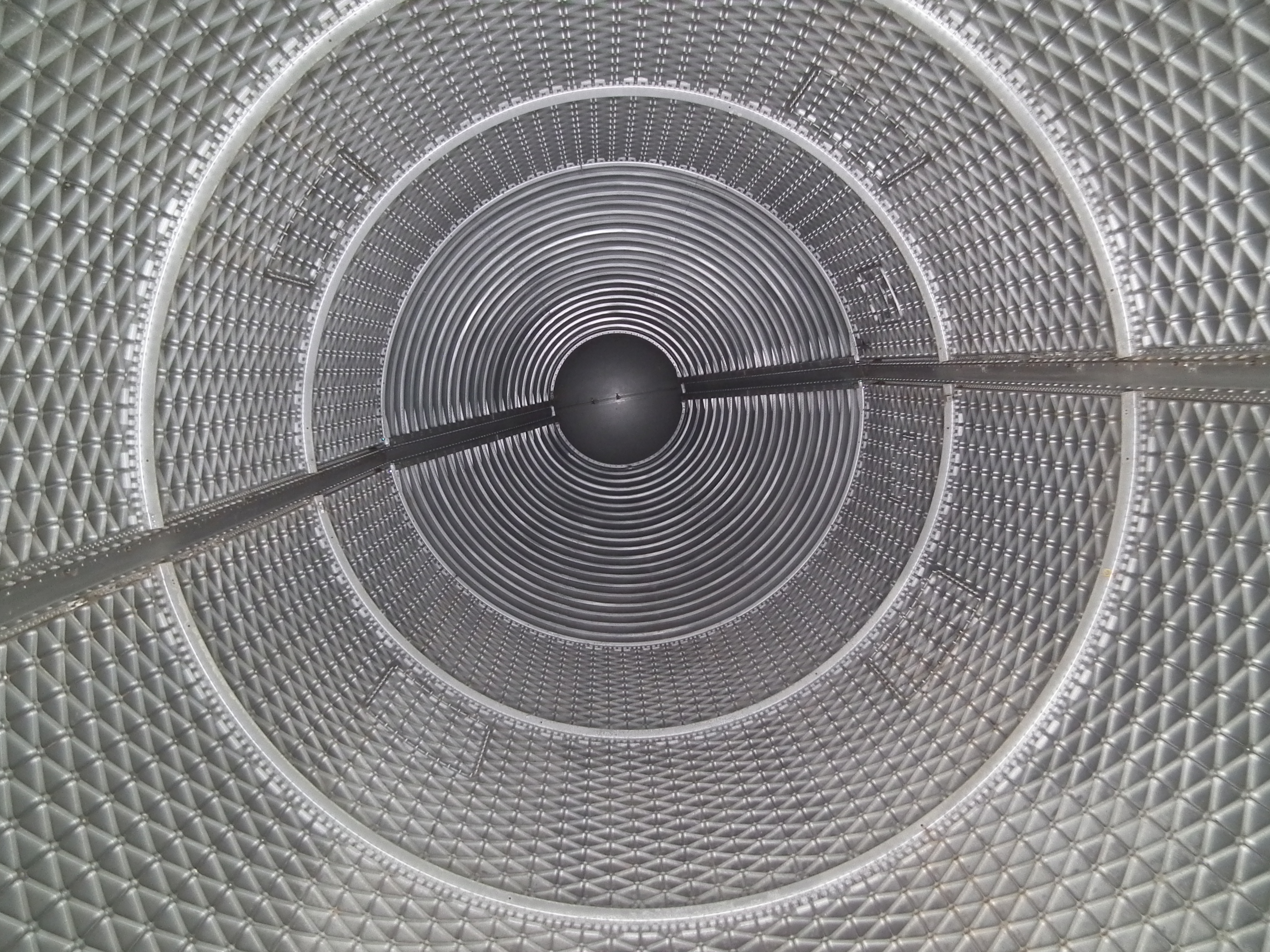
Heat shield of PSLV displayed at HAL heritage center.

PSLV-C6 was launched at 04:44 hours Coordinated Universal Time (10:14 hours Indian Standard Time) on 5 May 2005 from the second launch pad of the Satish Dhawan Space Centre. The mission was planned with pre-flight prediction of covering overall distance of 622 kilometres (386 mi). Following was the flight profile.

| Stage | Time (seconds) | Altitude (kilometer) | Velocity (meter/sec) | Event | Remarks |
|---|---|---|---|---|---|
| First stage | T+0 | 0.025 | 452 | Ignition of PS 1 | Lift off |
| First stage | T+1.19 | 0.026 | 452 | Ignition of 4 ground-lit PSOM | |
| First stage | T+25 | 2.463 | 551 | Ignition of 2 air-lit PSOM | |
| First stage | T+68 | 23.748 | 1,179 | Separation of 4 ground-lit PSOM | |
| First stage | T+90 | 42.768 | 1,659 | Separation of 2 air-lit PSOM | |
| First stage | T+112.03 | 67.411 | 1,995 | Separation of PS 1 | |
| Second stage | T+112.23 | 67.635 | 1,994 | Ignition of PS 2 | |
| Second stage | T+156.03 | 115.244 | 2,314 | Separation of heat shield | |
| Second stage | T+263.38 | 233.873 | 4,087 | Separation of PS 2 | |
| Third stage | T+264.58 | 235.304 | 4,083 | Ignition of HPS 3 | |
| Third stage | T+517.52 | 498.974 | 5,865 | Separation of HPS 3 | |
| Fourth stage | T+531.50 | 509.092 | 5,851 | Ignition of PS 4 | |
| Fourth stage | T+1,043.62 | 627.153 | 7,542 | Cut-off of PS 4 | |
| Fourth stage | T+1,080.62 | 627.801 | 7,546 | Cartosat-1 separation | |
| Fourth stage | T+1,120.62 | 628.535 | 7,546 | HAMSAT separation | Mission complete |

== See also ==
- Indian Space Research Organisation
- Polar Satellite Launch Vehicle
