= HAMSAT =

Microsatellite

- Organization: AMSAT-India, William Leijenaar
- Mission Type: Communications
- Satellite of: Earth
- Launch: May 5, 2005 on PSLV-C6
- Launch site: Sriharikota
- Mission duration: Achieved: 9 years and 2 months
- Mass: 42.5 kg (launch)

Orbital elements
- Semi-major axis: 7004.27 km
- Eccentricity: 0.0027
- Inclination: 97.89 degrees
- Orbital Period: 97.23 minutes
- Right ascension of the ascending node: 65.14 degrees
- Argument of perigee: 222.72 degrees

HAMSAT, also known as HAMSAT INDIA, VU2SAT and VO-52, is a microsatellite weighing 42.5 kilograms (93.7 lb), providing amateur radio satellite communications services for Indian and international amateur radio operators. This satellite carries the in-orbit designation of VO-52, and is an OSCAR series satellite.

== History ==
It was launched by PSLV-C6 on May 5, 2005. The main payload was an Indian Remote Sensing satellite, CARTOSAT-1 weighing 1,560 kilograms (3,440 lb). HAMSAT was placed into a polar Sun-synchronous orbit.

It carries two transponders, one built by William Leijenaar (Call Sign: PE1RAH), a Dutch Radio Amateur and graduate engineering student from the Higher Technical Institute at Venlo and the other by Ham enthusiasts with help from the ISRO (Indian Space Research Organisation). Each transponder is recognized by its beacon. The Indian transponder has an unmodulated carrier on 145.940 MHz. The Dutch transponder is modulated with telemetry information on 145.860 MHz. Both are linear transponders offering the CW, SSB and FM modes of amateur radio communication. They operate Mode-B for U-V operation with UHF uplink and VHF downlink.

The satellite joins many previous satellites in amateur radio service; mostly launched by AMSAT.

HAMSAT VO-52 failed in space on 11 July 2014, while on its 49,675th orbit, due to the failure of onboard lithium-ion batteries that have met their end of life. Although the satellite's systems and sub-systems are working normally as per the latest telemetry received, the onboard computer recurring to "Reset" mode due to the failure of batteries is hindering operation. Hence, it was decided not to expect any more meaningful and reliable services from HAMSAT VO-52. On 21 July 2014, ISRO decommissioned ‘HAMSAT-VO52′ officially.

HAMSAT VO-52 was designed for one-year mission life, but lasted for almost 10 years. The satellite was designed to be maintenance-free, and autonomous. It was a test bed for many new concepts such as a Bus Management Unit (BMU), lithium-ion-based power system, automatic spin rate control and spin axis orientation control (SAOC) for maintaining the satellite attitude without ground commanding. HAMSAT was known as “OSCAR-52” among Amateur HAM operators, and was popular internationally because of its high-sensitivity receiver and strong transmitter.

== Specifications ==
- The satellite is spin-stabilized. It spins at about 4 RPM.
- UHF uplink and VHF downlink
- Uplink transponder frequency: 435.250 MHz
- Downlink transponder frequency: 145.900 MHz
- Beacon frequencies: 145.860 MHz CW telemetry and 145.936 MHz unmodulated carrier
- Transponder bandwidth: 60 kHz
- Transmitter output power: 1 watt
- Antennas: VHF and UHF turnstiles
- Communication modes: CW, SSB, FM
- Electrical power: Gallium arsenide solar panels charging a lithium-ion battery
- Onboard computer: MAR 31750 processor in the spacecraft's electronic bus management unit for attitude control, telemetry, telecommand for ground control, sensor and actuator functions.

== See also ==
- Indian space program
- List of Indian satellites
- Amateur radio in India
