= PSLV-C40 =

42nd mission of the Polar Satellite Launch Vehicle

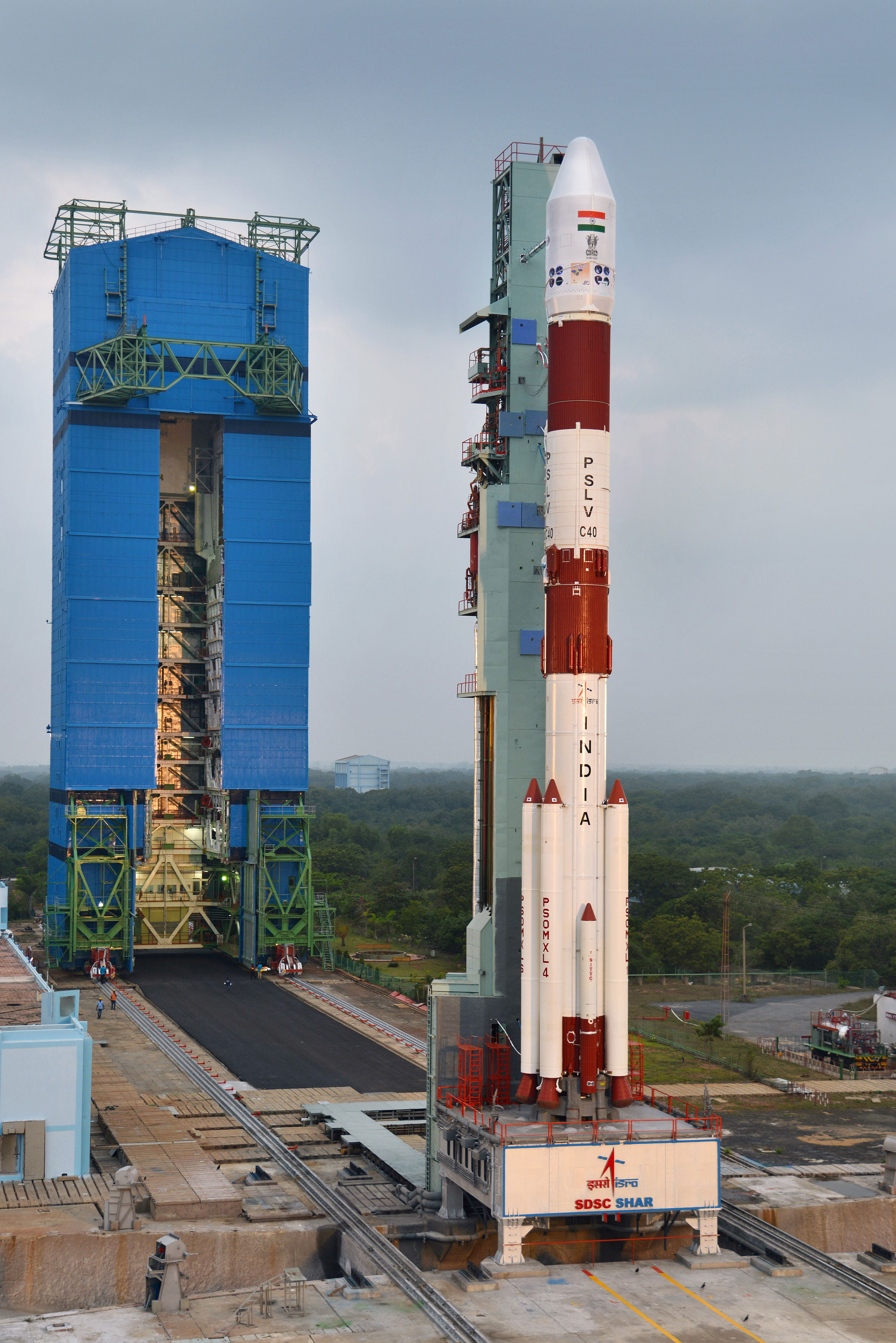
- PSLV-C40 before launch
- Mission type: Deployment of 31 satellites
- Operator: ISRO
- Website: ISRO website

Spacecraft properties
- Spacecraft: Polar Satellite Launch Vehicle
- Spacecraft type: Expendable launch vehicle
- Manufacturer: ISRO
- Payload mass: 1,323 kilograms (2,917 lb)

Start of mission
- Launch date: 09:28, 12 January 2018 (IST)
- Rocket: Polar Satellite Launch Vehicle
- Launch site: Sriharikota Launching Range
- Contractor: ISRO

Payload
- List of Satellites: (India) Cartosat-2F; (India) Microsat; (India) INS-1C; 28 Other

PSLV-C40 was the 42nd mission of the Indian Polar Satellite Launch Vehicle (PSLV) program in the XL configuration. PSLV-C40 successfully carried and deployed 31 satellites in Sun-synchronous orbits.

== Overview ==
Two Surrey Satellite Technology satellites were launched, the 100 kg Carbonite-2 Earth Observation technology demonstrator and the 168 kg Telesat LEO Phase 1 communications satellite.

Four SpaceBEE sub-CubeSats were launched to test "2-way satellite communications and data relay", probably for the Silicon Valley company Swarm Technologies. However, the U.S. Federal Communications Commission (FCC) had denied regulatory approval for Swarm Technologies 10 cm × 10 cm × 2.8 cm BEE satellites as they were too small to be reliably tracked by the United States Space Surveillance Network, so may become an impact hazard to other satellites. If confirmed, the FCC may take regulatory action over these satellites.

== Launched satellites ==
- Astranis DemoSat-2
- Carbonite-2
- Cartosat-2F (Cartosat-2 series satellite)
- ICEYE-X1
- INS-1C
- Microsat
- PicSat
- Arkyd-6
