= Cartosat-2E =

Indian earth observation satellite

- Names: CartoSat-2E
- Mission type: Earth observation
- Operator: ISRO
- COSPAR ID: 2017-036C
- SATCAT no.: 42767
- Website: https://www.isro.gov.in/
- Mission duration: 5 years (planned); 8 years, 5 months and 16 days (in progress)

Spacecraft properties
- Spacecraft: CartoSat-2E
- Bus: IRS-2
- Manufacturer: Indian Space Research Organisation
- Launch mass: 712 kg (1,570 lb)
- Power: 986 watts

Start of mission
- Launch date: 23 June 2017, 03:59 UTC
- Rocket: PSLV-XL, PSLV-C38
- Launch site: Satish Dhawan Space Centre, First Launch Pad (FLP)
- Contractor: Indian Space Research Organisation
- Entered service: 23 September 2017

Orbital parameters
- Reference system: Geocentric orbit
- Regime: Sun-synchronous orbit
- Perigee altitude: 495 km (308 mi)
- Apogee altitude: 510 km (320 mi)
- Inclination: 97.56°
- Period: 94.72 minutes
Instruments
- PAN: Panchromatic Camera
- HRMX: High-Resolution Multi-Spectral radiometer
- EvM: Event Monitoring camera

Cartosat-2E is an Earth observation satellite developed by the Indian Space Research Organisation (ISRO), and is the seventh in the Cartosat series. It is designed to collect high-resolution, large-scale imagery for use in urban planning, infrastructure development, utilities planning, and traffic management.

== Instruments ==
Cartosat-2E carries three primary instruments: the Panchromatic Camera (PAN), the High-Resolution Multi-Spectral radiometer (HRMX), and the Event Monitoring camera (EvM).

- Panchromatic camera (PAN) is capable of taking panchromatic (black and white) photographs in a selected portion of the visible and near-infrared spectrum (0.50–0.85 μm) at a resolution of 65 cm (26 in).
- High-Resolution Multi-Spectral (HRMX) radiometer is a four-channel radiometer sensitive across the entire visible spectrum and part of the near-infrared spectrum (0.43–0.90 μm) at a resolution of 2 m (6 ft 7 in).
- Event Monitoring camera (EvM) is also capable of capturing minute long video of a fixed spot as well, Event Monitoring camera (EvM) for frequent high-resolution land observation of selected areas.

== Launch ==
The satellite was launched on 23 June 2017, along with NIUSAT and 29 other satellites, aboard a PSLV-XL, PSLV-C38 launch vehicle from the Satish Dhawan Space Centre First Launch Pad. With a mass of 712 kg (1,570 lb), it is deployed into a 505 km (314 mi) Sun-synchronous orbit for a five-year primary mission. India has allocated ₹160 crore (US$25 million in 2017) for the project.

== See also ==
- List of Indian satellites
