= Cartosat-1 =

Indian earth observation satellite

- Cartosat-1 satellite
- Names: IRS-P5; Indian Remote Sensing Satellite-P5
- Mission type: Earth observation
- Operator: NTRO
- COSPAR ID: 2005-017A
- SATCAT no.: 28649
- Website: https://www.isro.gov.in/
- Mission duration: 5 years (planned); 14 years (achieved)

Spacecraft properties
- Spacecraft: IRS-P5
- Bus: IRS-1
- Manufacturer: ISRO
- Launch mass: 1,560 kg (3,440 lb)
- Power: 1100 watts

Start of mission
- Launch date: 5 May 2005, 04:44:00 UTC
- Rocket: Polar Satellite Launch Vehicle (PSLV-C6)
- Launch site: Satish Dhawan Space Centre, Second Launch Pad (SLP)
- Contractor: ISRO
- Entered service: August 2005

End of mission
- Deactivated: 5 May 2019

Orbital parameters
- Reference system: Geocentric orbit
- Regime: Sun-synchronous orbit
- Perigee altitude: 620 km (390 mi)
- Apogee altitude: 622 km (386 mi)
- Inclination: 97.87°
- Period: 97.1 minutes
Instruments
- PAN: Panchromatic Camera

Cartosat-1 (formerly IRS-P5) is a stereoscopic Earth observation satellite in a Sun-synchronous orbit, and the first one of the Cartosat series of satellites. The eleventh satellite of ISRO in Indian Remote Sensing Satellite (IRS) series. The satellite was launched by Indian Space Research Organisation and is operated by NTRO. Weighing around 1,560 kilograms (3,440 lb) at launch, its applications will mainly be towards cartography in India.

== Launch ==
It was launched by PSLV-C6, on 5 May 2005 at 04:44:00 UTC from the newly built Second Launch Pad at Sriharikota. Images from the satellite will be available from GeoEye for worldwide distribution. The satellite covers the entire globe in 1867 orbits on a 126-day cycle. Adjacent paths are covered by a separation of eleven days.

== History ==
Department of Space (DoS), government of India, has launched a series of satellites for Earth's resource management and monitoring. These satellites have been very successful in providing data in various scales ranging from 1:1 million to 1:12,500 scale. Each of the Indian Remote Sensing satellite missions ensured data continuity while introducing improvements in the spatial, spectral and radiometric resolutions. Considering increase demand for large scale and topographic mapping data DoS launched the Cartosat-1 in 2005. Cartosat-1 is dedicated to stereo viewing for large scale mapping and terrain modelling.

== Specifications ==
=== Payload ===
Cartosat-1 carries two state-of-the-art panchromatic (PAN) cameras that take black and white stereoscopic pictures of the Earth in the visible region of the electromagnetic spectrum. The swath covered by these high resolution PAN cameras is 30 kilometres (19 mi) and their spatial resolution is 2.5 metres (8 ft 2 in). For acquire two images simultaneously, one forward (PAN FORE) looking at +26° and one aft (PAN AFT) of the satellite at -5° for near instantaneous stereo data. The time difference between the acquisitions of the same scene by the two cameras is about 52 seconds. The spacecraft body is steerable to compensate the Earth rotation effect and to force both fore and aft cameras to look at the same ground strip when operated in stereo mode. The cameras are mounted on the satellite in such a way that near simultaneous imaging of the same area from two different angles is possible. This facilitates the generation of accurate three-dimensional maps. The cameras are steerable across the direction of the satellite's movement to facilitate the imaging of an area more frequently.

=== Communications ===
The images taken by Cartosat-1 cameras are compressed, encrypted, formatted and transmitted to the ground stations. The images are reconstructed from the data received at the ground stations. The National Remote Sensing Centre is responsible for acquisition, processing of data relayed by the Cartosat-1. A spherical Phased Array Antenna with steerable beam is used to transmit the data to the required ground station. A solid state recorder with 120 Gb capacity to store about 9 minutes of payload data is available for global operation of the payloads. The stored images can be transmitted when the satellite comes within the visibility zone of a ground station.

=== Optics and detectors ===
Each Panchromatic camera consists of three 3 mirror off-axis all reflective telescope with primary, secondary and tertiary mirrors. These mirrors are made from special zerodur glass blanks and are light weighted to about 60%. These mirrors are polished to an accuracy of l/80 and are coated with enhanced aluminium oxide (AlO_{2}) coating. In order to meet the high resolution and the swath requirement a 12K, 7 μm linear array charge-coupled device (CCD) is used as a detector.

== Imaging capabilities ==
=== Spatial resolution ===
- 2.5-metre (8 ft 2 in) panchromatic band (0.5-0.85 μm)

=== Temporal resolution ===
The revisit rate for Cartosat-1 is five days.

=== Radiometric resolution ===
The sensor collects data with a 10-bit sensitivity.

=== Swath ===
30 kilometres (19 mi) (PAN-F) and 25 kilometres (16 mi) (PAN-A)

== See also ==
- List of Indian satellites
