= PSLV-C38 =

40th mission of the Indian Polar Satellite Launch Vehicle program

- Mission type: Deployment of 31 satellites
- Operator: Indian Space Research Organisation
- Website: ISRO website

Spacecraft properties
- Spacecraft: Polar Satellite Launch Vehicle
- Spacecraft type: Expendable launch vehicle
- Manufacturer: ISRO

Start of mission
- Launch date: 09:29, 23 June 2017 (IST)
- Rocket: Polar Satellite Launch Vehicle
- Launch site: Sriharikota Launching Range
- Contractor: ISRO

Payload
- List of Satellites : (India) Cartosat-2E; (India) NIUSAT; (Japan) CE-SAT1; (Austria) ATO-3 Pegasus; (Czech Republic) VZLUSat-1; (Slovakia) SkCube; (Finland) Aalto-1 SuomiSat; (United States) CICERO-6; (United States) KickSat Sprites ×6

PSLV-C38 was the 40th mission of the Indian Polar Satellite Launch Vehicle (PSLV) program and its 17th mission in the XL configuration. PSLV-C38 successfully carried and deployed 31 satellites in Sun-synchronous orbit. It was launched on 23 June 2017 by the Indian Space Research Organisation (ISRO) from the Satish Dhawan Space Centre at Sriharikota, Andhra Pradesh.

== Payload and other parameters ==
PSLV-C38 carried the Indian mapping satellite Cartosat-2E as its main payload that weighed 712 kg (1,570 lb). 30 smaller satellites were carried as secondary payload, among them the Indian university NIUSAT monitoring satellite, Japanese CE-SAT1 technology demonstrator, Austrian AT-03 Pegasus research satellite and American CICERO-6 weather satellite. Satellites of Belgium, Chile, the Czech Republic VZLUSat-1, Finland, France, Germany, Italy, Latvia, Lithuania, Slovakia SkCube, and the United Kingdom were also launched.

The NIUSAT satellite, weighing around 15 kg (33 lb), was prepared as a collaborative work by over 200 students of the Noorul Islam University, Kanyakumari and is used for disaster management and crop monitoring. The work on the satellite began in 2007 and cost ₹37 crore (US$3.8 million) with help from ISRO. It was conceived by University's chancellor A. P. Majeed Khan post 2004 Indian Ocean tsunami disaster.

Minister of State in the Prime Minister's Office Jitendra Singh stated that ISRO earned ₹45.2 crore (EUR 6.1 million) from launching foreign satellites on PSLV-C38.
