= Sankarasubramanian. K =

Indian solar scientist

- Born: India
- Education: Indian Institute of Astrophysics (PhD)
- Occupation: Solar scientist
- Organization: Indian Space Research Organisation (ISRO)
- Known for: Principal scientist of Aditya-L1

Sankarasubramanian. K is an Indian solar scientist who works at the U R Rao Satellite Centre (URSC) of Indian Space Research Organisation (ISRO), India's national space agency. He is the principal scientist of Aditya-L1, India's first solar mission, which was launched successfully on 2 September 2023. He is also heading the Space Astronomy Group of URSC

== Education ==
Sankarasubramanian carried out his PhD in physics at the Indian Institute of Astrophysics, Bangalore, Karnataka, through the Bangalore University. His research areas of interest are instrumentation, optics and the solar magnetic field. He obtained his master's degree in physics from The American College, Madurai, Tamil Nadu, and bachelor's degree in physics from The MDT Hindu College, Tirunelveli.

After his PhD from the Indian Institute of Astrophysics, Bangalore, Karnataka, he carried out his post-doctoral research at the National Solar Observatory, New Mexico, US, where he was the principal investigator for the Diffraction Limited Spectro-polarimeter instrument.

== Career ==
Sankarasubramanian has made numerous contributions to many of ISRO's missions, namely AstroSat, Chandrayaan-1, and Chandrayaan-2. As of September 2023, he is in charge of the URSC's Space Astronomy Group (SAG), which is working to build scientific payloads for the Aditya-L1 & XPoSat missions, and science payloads atop the Chandrayaan-3 propulsion module. In October 2022, he was appointed the principal scientist of the Aditya L1 mission. He is the lead researcher for one of Aditya-L1's X-ray payloads. Also, Sankarasubramanian is leading the Aditya-L1 Science Working Group, which includes researchers studying solar science from a number of Indian institutions and Universities.
