= PSLV-C57 =

Solar Observatory launch mission

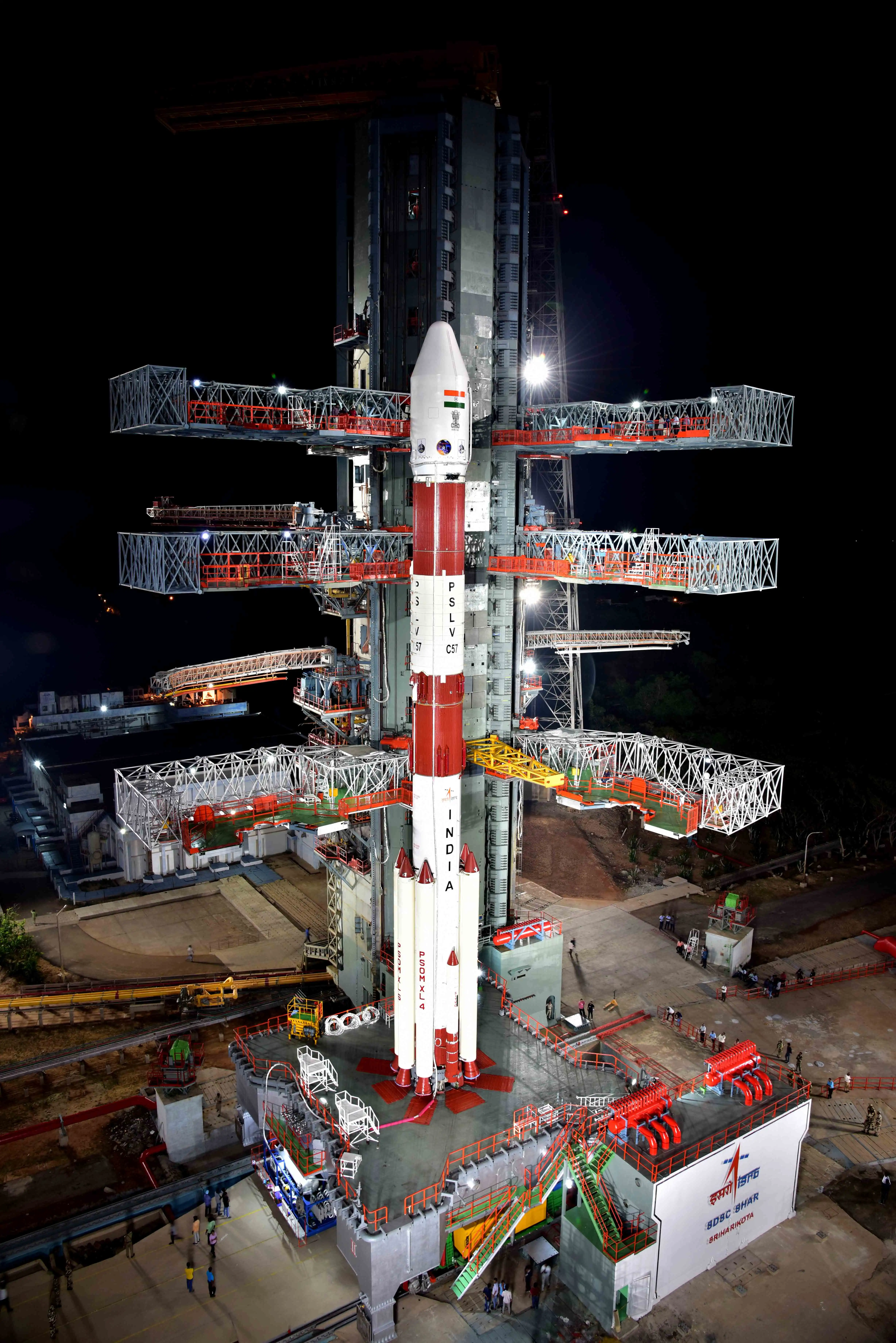
- PSLV-C57 on Second Launch Pad (SLP)

launch
- Launch: 02 September 2023; 06:20 (UTC)
- Pad: Second Launch Pad Satish Dhawan Space Centre
- Payload: (India) Aditya-L1

PSLV launches

The PSLV-C57 was the 59th mission of Indian Space Research Organisation's Polar Satellite Launch Vehicle (PSLV), which carried India's indigenously made solar observatory Aditya-L1.

== Launch ==
It was launched on Saturday, 02 September 2023 at 11:50 IST / 06:20 UTC from Satish Dhawan Space Centre, Sriharikota, Andhra Pradesh, India. This was India's first Solar Observatory ever launched in history. Aditya-L1 was injected into an elliptical orbit of 235x19500 km around the Earth. On 6 January 2024, Aditya-L1 spacecraft, India's first solar mission, has successfully entered its final orbit with a period of approximately 180 days around the first Sun-Earth Lagrangian point (L1), approximately 1.500 million kilometers from Earth.

== Mission overview ==
Primary payload: Aditya-L1

PSLV configuration: PSLV-XL

Mission Characteristics
Parameter	Orbit
Alt (km)	235x19500
Inclination (deg.)	19.2
Launch Pad	SLP
