= Laboratory for Electro-Optics Systems =

Space research centre of ISRO

Agency overview
- Formed: 1993; 33 years ago
- Jurisdiction: Department of Space
- Headquarters: Bangalore, in Karnataka, India
- Annual budget: See the budget of ISRO
- Agency executive: A. S. Laxmi Prasad, Director
- Parent agency: ISRO
- Website: URSC home page

Laboratory for Electro-Optics Systems (LEOS) is a research lab belonging to ISRO. It involves in design and development of optics and sensor modules that can be deployed either onboard satellite or with the launch vehicle.

== History ==
Established in 1993, the Laboratory for Electro-Optics Systems was established at the same place where the first Indian satellite Aryabhata was fabricated in 1975, namely Bangalore. The laboratory has developed sensors for tracking Earth and Stars for the satellites which were launched when the space research was ushering in India. Satellites like Aryabata, Bhaskara, Apple, IRS, SROSS and INSAT-2 have been equipped with the sensors developed by this laboratory. The lab has also participated in the India's first Moon mission Chandrayaan-1. They have an instrument in ISRO's mission to Sun, Aditya-L1 designed to measure the magnetic fields around Lagrangian points.
