= S. Srinivasan =

Indian aerospace engineer

- Born: 14 April 1941; Asikkadu, Mayiladuthurai district, Madras Presidency, British India
- Died: 1 September 1999 (aged 58); Chennai, Tamil Nadu, India
- Occupations: Aeronautical engineer Space scientist
- Years active: 1970–1999
- Organization: Vikram Sarabhai Space Centre
- Known for: Development of satellite launch vehicles
- Movement: Indian Space Program
- Spouse: Lakshmi Srinivasan
- Children: A daughter and a son
- Awards: Padma Bhushan (2000); National Aeronautics Prize; FIE Foundation National award

Suryanarayanan Srinivasan (14 April 1941 – 1 September 1999) was an Indian aeronautical engineer and the Director of the Vikram Sarabhai Space Centre (VSSC), known for his pioneering work in rocket science. He also served as the director of Satish Dhawan Space Centre and assisted A. P. J. Abdul Kalam in the SLV3 Mission as its deputy director. He was an elected Fellow of the Aeronautical Society of India and the Indian National Academy of Engineering. The Government of India awarded him the third highest civilian honour of the Padma Bhushan, in 2000, for his contributions to Indian space program.

== Biography ==
Srinivasan was born on 14 April 1941 in a small village called Asikkadu in Mayiladuthurai district in the south Indian state of Tamil Nadu. He was born into a traditional Tamil Brahmin Iyer family, and grew up performing traditional rituals. He graduated in electrical engineering (BE) with honours from Annamalai University and secured a post-graduate degree in aeronautical engineering from the Indian Institute of Science (IISc), Bangalore. He was married to the daughter of Subramanian Iyer of Arayapuram, Lakshmi and had two children. He started his career as an aeronautical engineer at Hindustan Aeronautics Limited (HAL), but took a break to move to Ohio State University for his doctoral studies from where he obtained a PhD in engineering mechanics in 1970. Returning to India the same year, he joined Indian Space Research Organization (ISRO) where he would work for the rest of his life.

Srinivasan's early assignments at ISRO included the development of Rohini satellite and later, the initiation of satellite launch vehicle (SLV) from 1973 onwards. In 1980, when A. P. J. Abdul Kalam started his work on SLV-3, Srinivasan assisted him as the deputy director of the project and successfully launched the vehicle. The duo launched several SLV-3 flights in the ensuing years till he was moved to the Polar Satellite Launch Vehicle (PSLV) project, the first indigenously designed Indian Satellite Launch Vehicle. In 1988, he became the director of the Integrated Launch Vehicle Program but continued to be associated with PSLV and Geosynchronous Satellite Launch Vehicle (GSLV) programs. He headed Satish Dhawan Space Centre (SHAR), Shreeharikota, for a while before moving to Thiruvananthapuram to head the Vikram Sarabhai Space Centre (VSSC) in 1994. At VSSC, he was reported to have been involved with the configuration, design, development and execution of the PSLV project, culminating in the first successful commercial launch of the vehicle on 26 May 1999. Five months after the launch, he died in harness on 1 September 1999, at the age of 58, survived by his wife Lakshmi and two children, now settled abroad.

== Awards, honors and positions ==
Srinivasan was an elected fellow of the Indian National Academy of Engineering. He was a member of the National Steering Committee of the 21st (1997) and the 23rd National Systems Conference (NSC) (1999) and a member of the National Advisory Council of the 13th National Convention of Aerospace Engineers held in 1997. He was an honorary Fellow of the Indian Society for Non-Destructive Testing and was associated with the Thiruvananthapuram Chapter of the Indian Society for Advancement of Materials and Process Engineering (ISAMPE) A recipient of the National Aeronautics Prize and the FIE Foundation National award, he was awarded the civilian honor of the Padma Bhushan posthumously, the award being announced on 26 January 2000, four months after his death. VSSC organizes an annual oration, Dr. S. Srinivasan Memorial Lecture, in honor of its former director.

== See also ==
- Rohini (satellite)
- A. P. J. Abdul Kalam
- Polar Satellite Launch Vehicle
- Geosynchronous Satellite Launch Vehicle

Government offices
Preceded by Pramod Kale	Director, Vikram Sarabhai Space Centre; 1994 - 1999	Succeeded by G. Madhavan Nair
