= V. P. Balagangadharan =

Indian science communicator

- Born: Vannadil Puthiyaveettil Balagangadharan; 20 January 1950 (age 76); Payyanur, Kerala, India
- Education: Master of Science in Chemistry
- Alma mater: University of Kerala, Savitribai Phule Pune University
- Years active: 1971–present
- Organization: Indian Space Research Organization
- Awards: Kerala Science Literature Award, 2015

Vannadil Puthiyaveettil "V. P." Balagangadharan (born 20 January 1950) is a space scientist, author, and speaker from India, known for his contributions to propellant research, technology transfer, and science communication. He has worked with the Indian Space Research Organisation for over four decades in various roles.

== Education ==
After finishing his schooling at AV Smaraka Govt. Higher Secondary School, Karivellur, and Pre-Degree from Payyanur College, Balagangadharan joined Malabar Christian College, Kozhikode in 1967, from where he completed his Bachelor of Science in Chemistry in 1970. While working at Vikram Sarabhai Space Centre, he completed his Master of Science in Chemistry from Pune University in 1989.

== Career ==
Balagangadharan started his career as an Analytical Chemist at Bombay Oil Industries, Angamaly in 1971. In 1972, he joined Vikram Sarabhai Space Centre as a Scientific Assistant in its Propellant Engineering Division, later Analytical & Spectroscopy Division. After almost four decades of service, in 2010, he superannuated as the Group Head, Technology Transfer and Documentation Division at the centre. Post superannuation, he held the emeritus role as Prof. Brahm Prakash Scientist—two stints, separated by a one year role as Consultant and Advisor (Media & Communications)—till 2014.

He was formerly the Chairman of the Patent Advisory Committee of the Government of Kerala.

== Science communication ==
He has over 30 research publications in the area of Analytical chemistry. He has delivered over three hundred talks, and shows on All India Radio and Doordarshan. He has lectured across India on India's space history and Intellectual Property Rights. He has also written many articles in the print media on popular science, space research and IPR.

== Books ==
- Rockets and Beyond, 2012, Vigyan Prasar
- Mangalyaan:Oru Shastragnante Kurippukal, 2015, Jnaneswari Publications
- From Fishing Hamlet To Red Planet, 2016, HarperCollins
- Indian Bahirakasa Gaveshana Charithram, 2018, DC Books
- Chandrayaan-2, 2019, DC Books
- Ever Upwards: ISRO in Images, 2019, Orient Blackswan
- Panthranduper Chandranil, 2021, Priyatha Books
- Kuttikalude Rocket Pusthakam, 2021, Jnaneswari Publications
- Chinnalu Kanda Rocket, 2022, GV Books
- Vikram Sarabhai Rocketil Oru Jeevitham, 2022, GV Books
- Indian Rocketinte Shilpikal, 2024, DC Books
- Sunita Williams-inte Bahirakasha Yathrakal, 2025, Jnaneswari Publications
- Bahirakasa Jeevitham, 2025, Kerala Bhasha Institute

== Awards and honours ==
Kerala State Science Literature Award, 2015, Kerala State Council for Science, Technology and Environment Fellow, Kerala Academy of Sciences

HEMSI-MR Kurup Endowment Award, 2021 for contributions to the area of solid propellants
