= K. Sivan =

Indian aerospace engineer

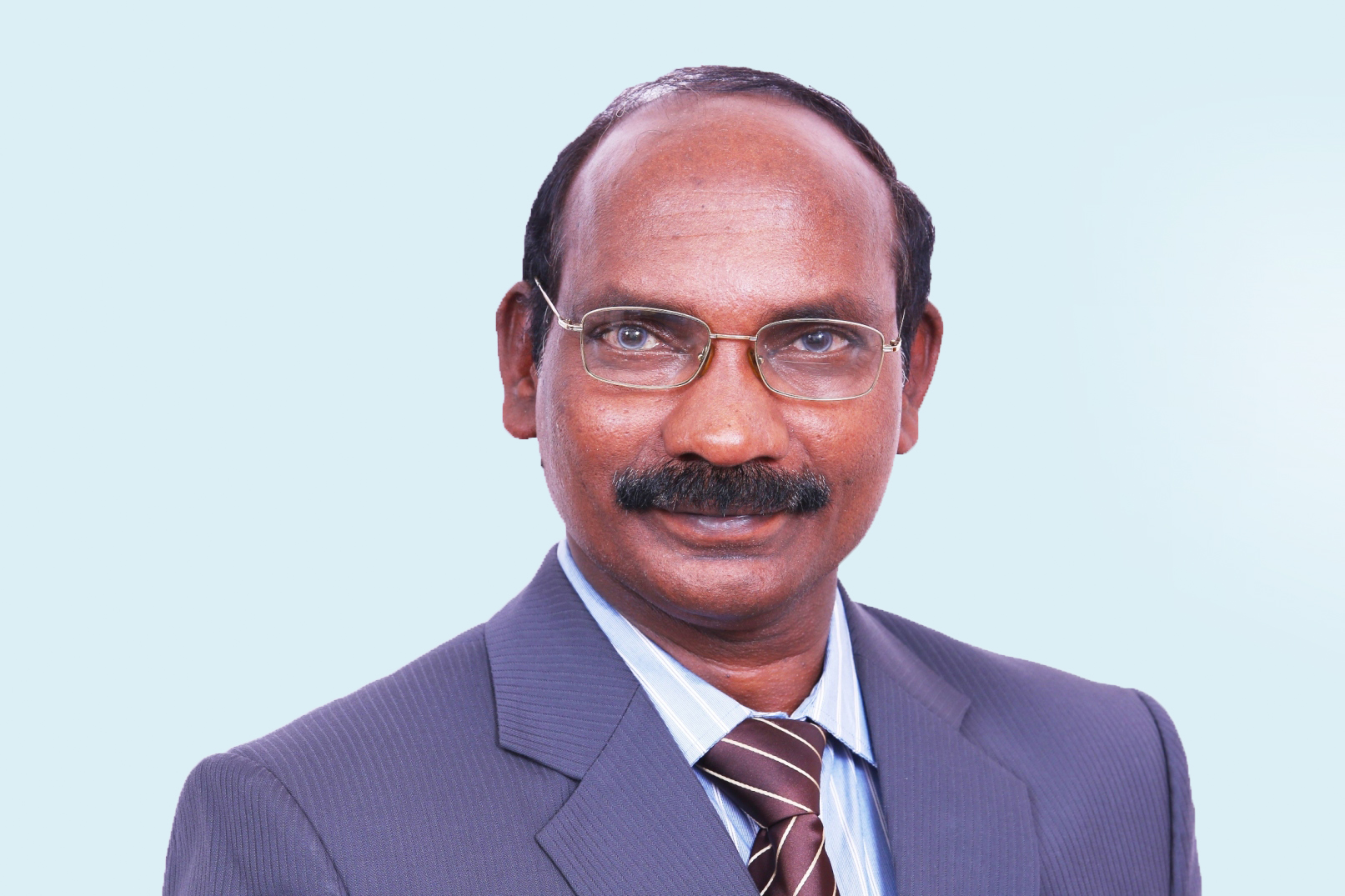
- Official portrait

9th Chairman of ISRO
- In office 15 January 2018 – 14 January 2022
- Preceded by: A. S. Kiran Kumar
- Succeeded by: S. Somanath

12th Director of Vikram Sarabhai Space Centre
- In office 2015–2018
- Preceded by: M. C. Dathan
- Succeeded by: S. Somanath

Personal details
- Born: Kailasavadivoo Sivan; 14 April 1957 (age 69) Sarakkalvilai, Tamil Nadu, India
- Education: Madurai Kamaraj University (B.Sc.); Madras Institute of Technology (B.Tech.); IISc Bengaluru (M.E.); IIT Bombay (Ph.D.)

Kailasavadivu Sivan (born 14 April 1957) is an Indian aerospace engineer who served as the secretary of the Department of Space and chairman of ISRO and Space Commission. He has previously served as the director of the Vikram Sarabhai Space Center and the Liquid Propulsion Systems Centre.

== Early life ==
Sivan was born in Sarakkalvilai, near Nagercoil in Kanyakumari district of Tamil Nadu in India. He is the son of a mango farmer (his father Kailasa Vadivu) and his mother Chellam.

== Education ==
Sivan studied in a Tamil language government school in Sarakkalvilai Village and later in Vallan Kumaran Vilai, in Kanyakumari district. He is the first graduate from his family. Sivan graduated with a bachelor's degree in aeronautical engineering from Madras Institute of Technology in 1980. He then got a master's degree in aerospace engineering from the Indian Institute of Science in 1982, and started working at ISRO. He earned a doctorate in aerospace engineering from the Indian Institute of Technology, Bombay in 2006. He is a Fellow of the Indian National Academy of Engineering, the Aeronautical Society of India and the Systems Society of India. He was conferred Doctor of Science (Honoris Causa) from Sathyabama University, Chennai in April 2014.

== Career ==
Sivan worked on the design and development of launch vehicles for Indian Space Research Organisation (ISRO). Sivan joined ISRO in 1982 to participate on the Polar Satellite Launch Vehicle Project. Sivan played a major role in reviving the Geosynchronous Satellite Launch Vehicle programme. The 6D trajectory simulation software SITARA was developed under the guidance of Sivan. He was appointed the director of ISRO's Liquid Propulsion Systems Centre on 2 July 2014. On 1 June 2015, he became the director of Vikram Sarabhai Space Centre.

Sivan was appointed the chief of ISRO in January 2018 and he assumed office on 15 January. Under his chairmanship, ISRO launched Chandrayaan-2, their second mission to the Moon, on 22 July 2019, of which the Vikram lander and Pragyan rover crashed; the orbiter was not affected and is still orbiting the Moon as of September 2023.

On 30 December 2020, his chairmanship was extended by a year to January 2022. His earlier tenure was up to January 2021.

On 25 January 2021, the Central Vigilance Commission (CVC) has registered a complaint against K Sivan over allegations of irregularities in recruiting his son in ISRO’s Liquid Propulsion Systems Centre (LPSC) in Valiamala, Thiruvananthapuram, bypassing hiring standards.

Sivan has been appointed the chairman of the Board of Governors at the Indian Institute of Technology, Indore. He will replace Deepak B P, whose term ended on 21 August 2023.

== Awards ==
- Dr. A.P.J. Abdul Kalam Award, 2019.
- IEEE Simon Ramo Medal, shared with Byrana N. Suresh, 2020.

Government offices
Preceded by A. S. Kiran Kumar	Chairman of the ISRO; 2018 - 2022	Succeeded by S. Somanath
Preceded by Madhavan Chandradathan	Director, VSSC; 2015 - 2018	Succeeded by S. Somanath
