= P. S. Veeraraghavan =

Indian space scientist

- Born: Parivakkam Subramaniam Veeraraghavan; 24 December 1948 (age 77); Tamil Nadu, India
- Education: B.E. (Engineering - Electrical) (1969), College of Engineering, Guindy; MTech (Engineering - Electrical and Electronics Instrumentation) (1971), Indian Institute of Technology, Madras
- Known for: Indian Space Program
- Awards: ASI Award (2002); VASVIK Award (1997); ISRO Performance Excellence Award (2007)
- Scientific career
- Fields: Rocket Technology and Electrical and Electronics Engineering
- Workplaces: Indian Space Research Organisation

Parivakkam Subramaniam Veeraraghavan (Tamil: பரிவக்கம் சுப்ரமணியம் வீரராகவன்; born 24 December 1948) is a space scientist and rocket technologist from India. He has served as the Director of the Vikram Sarabhai Space Centre (VSSC), in Thiruvananthapuram, Kerala, and as the Director of the ISRO Inertial Systems Unit (IISU). As a senior scientist at the Indian Space Research Organization (ISRO), Veeraraghavan is known for his contributions to launch vehicle technology, especially in the areas of integration & checkout and Inertial Systems of ISROs launch vehicles. Presently, he holds the honorary position of Vikram Sarabhai Distinguished Professor in VSSC, ISRO since January 2013.

== Education and career ==
Veeraraghavan studied in Gopalapuram Boys High School in Chennai. After receiving his bachelor's degree in electrical engineering from the College of Engineering, Guindy in 1969, he joined the Master's Program at the Indian Institute of Technology, Madras and received his M.Tech. degree in Electrical and Electronics Instrumentation in 1971. He started his career in the Vikram Sarabhai Space Centre, Indian Space Research Organisation in 1971. His first assignment was as Engineer-in-Charge of Checkout System development in the SLV-3 (Satellite Launch Vehicle) Project under the leadership of former ISRO scientist & former President of India, A. P. J. Abdul Kalam. He was responsible for the design and development of the checkout system for the first SLV-3 Project. Veeraraghavan trained in Diamante Launching from 1971-72 at CNES, and visited major space centres in Japan, U.S.A and France in 1984. At VSSC, he has been the Deputy Director, Mechanisms and Vehicle Integration and Testing (MVIT) and was responsible for integration, check-out and launch of ISRO Augmented Satellite Launch Vehicles (ASLV), Geosynchronous Satellite Launch Vehicles (GSLV), and Polar Satellite Launch Vehicles (PSLV).

In 2002, he took over as Director of ISRO Inertial Systems Unit (IISU) at Vattiyoorkavu, Thiruvananthapuram. At IISU he led the teams that developed sensor systems for launch vehicles and satellites. These inertial navigation systems guide the rockets in their trajectory, thus helping them to put the satellites in precise orbits. In 2009, Veeraraghavan took over as Director of VSSC from K. Radhakrishnan who has been appointed Chairman, Indian Space Research Organisation.

== Positions held ==
P. S. Veeraraghavan joined Indian Space Research Programme in 1971 in the erstwhile SLV-3 Project. He served in the following capacities prior to assuming charge as Director, Vikram Sarabhai Space Centre (VSSC), Thiruvananthapuram (Trivandrum), India:-

- Engineer-in-Charge, Checkout System Development, SLV-3 (1971–1982)
- Deputy Project Director, Electrical Integration and Checkout System (1982–1988)
- Head, Launch Vehicle Integration & Checkout Division, PSLV Project (1988–1993)
- Group Director, Launch Vehicle Integration & Checkout Group (1993–1999)
- Deputy Director, Mechanisms, Vehicle Integration & Testing Entity, VSSC (1999–2002)
- Director, ISRO Inertial Systems Unit, IISU, Thiruvananthapuram (2002–2009)
- Director, Vikram Sarabhai Space Centre (November 2009-December 2012)
- Prof. Vikram Sarabhai Distinguished Professor (January 2013 onwards)

P. S. Veeraraghavan has made pioneering contributions to ISRO's Launch Vehicle Programmes. As Deputy Director of VSSC - Mechanisms and Vehicle Integration Testing (MVIT) he was responsible for Assembly, Integration and Checkout of ISRO's launch vehicles, PSLV and GSLV till June 2002.

In 2002, he took over as Director, ISRO Inertial Systems Unit (IISU), Vattiyoorkavu, Thiruvananthapuram. At IISU, he was responsible for the development of Inertial System for both Launch Vehicle and Spacecraft. These inertial navigation systems guide the rockets through their trajectory to put the satellite in precise orbits. The performance of these inertial navigation systems has been at par with those of other space fairing nations like Europe and the United States of America with excellent orbit injection accuracy.

The inertial navigation systems supplied by IISU for PSLV-C11 / Chandrayaan-1, India's first mission to the moon, have given orbital accuracy and contributed to precise orbital manoeuvres and lunar injection. Under his leadership, IISU developed advanced inertial sensors and systems to support domestic space technology development.

In 2009, Dr S Ramakrishnan took over as Director, Vikram Sarabhai Space Centre - VSSC from Veeraraghavan, who has been appointed as Chairman, Indian Space Research Organisation. Under his able leadership, VSSC made sparkling successes through 6 missions of PSLV namely PSLV C15/CARTOSAT 2B, PSLV C16/ RESOURCESAT, PSLV C17/GSAT12, PSLC18/MEGHAPROPIQUES, PSLV C19/RISAT1 and PSLV C21/SPOT6 and two missions of GSLV including the first test flight of indigenous Cryogenic stage. During his period, several major facilities of international class were established in VSSC like 1m Hypersonic Wind Tunnel, 6MW Plasma Wind Tunnel & Shock tunnel, 25Ton vibration shaker facility, 220Terra Flops super computing facility, etc. He also masterminded the development of various critical technologies and systems for the advanced missions of ISRO like Air Breathing Propulsion Project and Reusable Launch Vehicle Project.

== Honors and awards ==
Veeraraghavan was a recipient of the VASVIK Award (Electronics) in 1997. He was also the recipient of the ASI Award of Astronautical Society of India. The 2002 ASI award was in recognition of his contribution to rocket and related technologies. He has also received the ISRO's Performance Excellence Award in 2007 and the National Aeronautical Prize by Aeronautical Society of India in 2011.

== Fellowships/memberships ==
- Fellow, Aeronautical Society of India
- Fellow, Indian National Academy of Engineering
- Member, Astronautical Society of India
- Member, Indian National Society for Aerospace & Related Mechanisms.

== Publications ==
He was involved in publishing more than 1000 technical documents and 100 technical papers for projects in PSLV, GSLV, RSR, SRE, etc. as well as various satellite projects with the ISRO.

Government offices
Preceded by K. Radhakrishnan	Director, Vikram Sarabhai Space Centre; 2009 - 2012	Succeeded by S. Ramakrishnan
