= Rajyotsava Awards (2022) =

Awards given by the government of Karnataka, India

Rajyotsava Awards are awarded every year on November 1, the eve of Karnataka Rajyotsava, the day Karnataka State was formed.

Below are the dignitaries, who were awarded the same for the year 2022.

== Sankeerna (Complex) Category ==
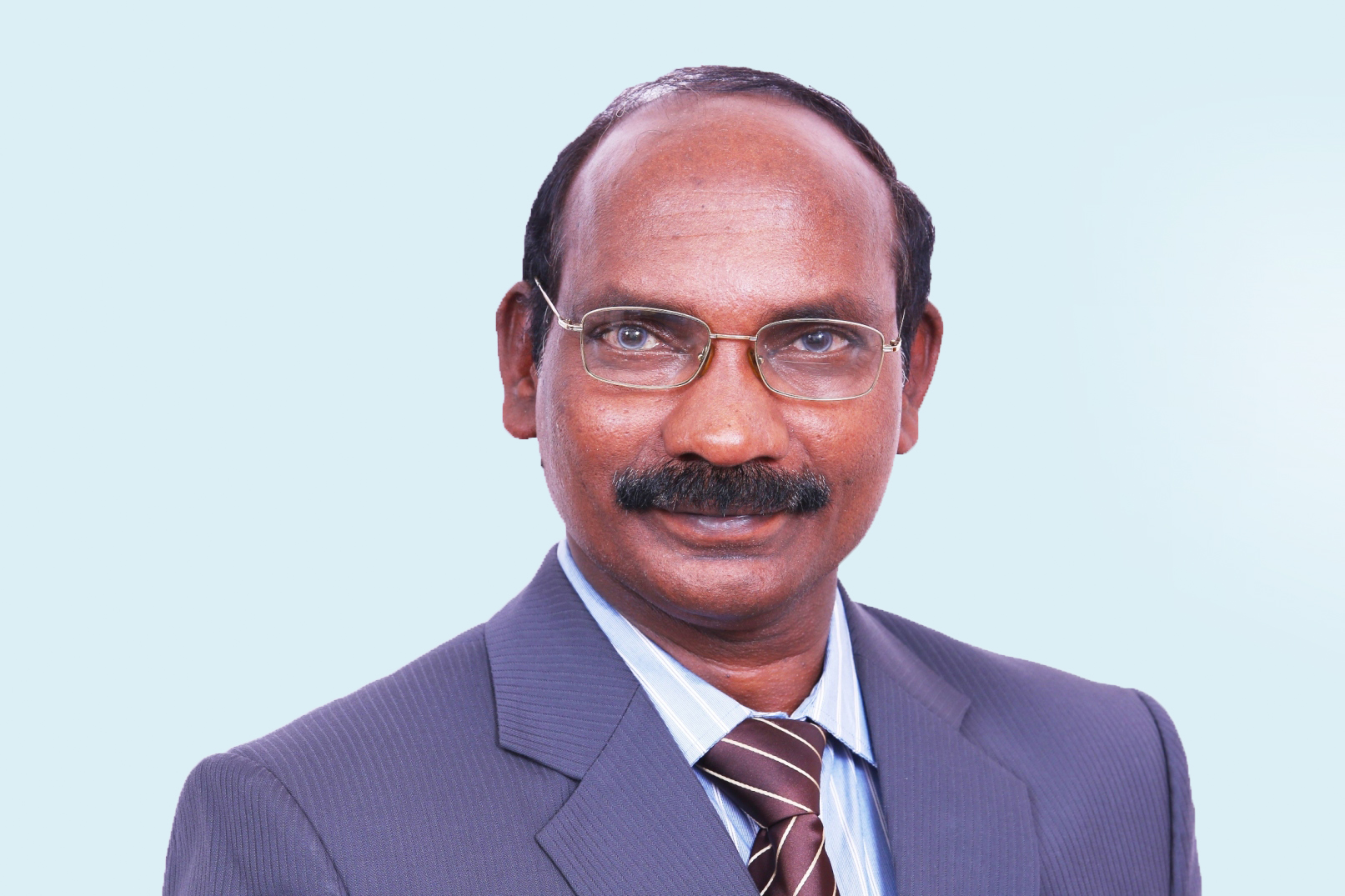
Dr. K. Sivan, ISRO

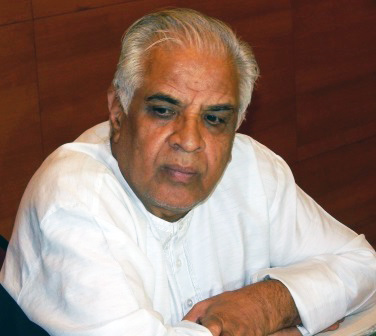
H.G. Dattatreya

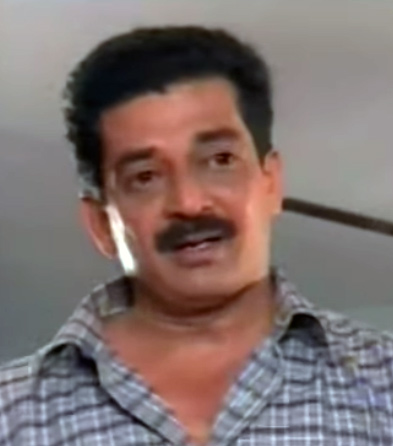
Avinash Yelandur

Achievers whose contribution is in more than 1 field are awarded under

1. Subbarama Shetty (Bangalore)
2. Vidwan Gopal Krishna Sharma (Bangalore),
3. Mrs. Soligara Madamma (Chamarajanagar)

== Military Service/Soldiers ==
1. Subedar BK Kumaraswamy (Bangalore)

== Journalism ==
1. H.R. Srisha (Bangalore),
2. GM Shirahatti (Gadag)

== Agriculture ==
1. Ganesh Thimmaiah (Kodagu),
2. Chandrasekhar Narayanpur (Chikkamagaluru)

== Science and Technology ==
1. K. Sivan (Bangalore)
2. D.R.Baluragi (Raichur)

== Environment ==
1. Salumada Ninganna (Ramanagar)

== Civil Service ==
1. Mallamma Hoovina Hadagali, pourakarmika personnel (Vijayanagar)

== Administration ==
1. L.H. Manjunath (Shivamogga),
2. Madan Gopal IAS (Retd) (Bangalore)

== NRK/Abroad ==
1. Devidas Shetty (Mumbai),
2. Arvind Patil (Overseas),
3. Krishnamurthy Manja (Telangana)
4. Rajkumar of Gulf Country (Gulf Nation)

== Medical ==
1. Dr. H. S. Mohan (Shivamogga)
2. Dr. Basavanthappa (Davanagere)

== Social service ==
1. Ravishetti (South Kannada)
2. Kariappa (Bangalore Rural)
3. MS KoriShetter (Haveri)
4. D. Madegowda (Mysore)
5. Balbir Singh (Bidar)

== Media Brroadcasting ==
1. BV Naidu (Bangalore)
2. Jayaram Banan (Udupi)
3. Srinivas (Kolar)

== Theatre ==
1. Tippanna Helavar (Yadagiri)
2. Lalitabai Channadasar (Vijaypur)
3. Gurunath Hoogar (Kalaburgi)
4. Prabhakar Joshi (Udupi)
5. Srishaila Huddar (Haveri)

== Music ==
1. Narayan.M (South Kannada)
2. Anantacharya Balacharya (Dharwad)
3. Anjinappa Satpadi (Chikkaballapur)
4. Ananta Kulkarni (Bagalakot)

== Folklore ==
1. Samadevappa Erappa Nadiger (Northern Kannada)
2. Gudda Panara-Divine Dancer (Udupi)
3. Kamalamma Midwife (Raichur)
4. Savitri Pujar (Dharwad)
5. Rachaiah Salimath (Balakote),
6. Mahadeshwar Gowda Lingadahalli, Veeragase (Haveri)

== Sculpture ==
1. Parushuram Pawar (Bagalakot),
2. Hanumanthappa Balappa Hukkeri (Belagavi)

== Painting/Fine Arts ==
1. Sannarangappa Chitrakar-Kinna's Art (Koppal)

== Movie ==
1. Wing Commander H G Dattatreya popularly known as Dattanna (Chitradurga)
2. Avinash Yelandur (Bangalore)

== Television ==
1. Sihi Kahi Chandru (Bangalore)

== Yakshagana ==
1. MA Naik (Udupi)
2. Subrahmanya Dhareshwar (Uttar Kannada)
3. Sarapadi Ashok Shetty (South Kannada)

== Open ==
1. Advaiah Cha Hiremath-Doddata (Dharwad)
2. Shankarappa Mallappa Horpet (Koppal)
3. H. Pandurangappa (Bellary)

== Literature ==
1. Shankar Buchadi (Belagavi)
2. Krishna Gowda (Mysore)
3. Ashoka Babu Nilagarh (Belagavi)
4. A. Ra Mitra (Hassan)
5. Ramakrishna Marathe (Kalaburgi)

== Education ==
1. Koti Rangappa (Tumkur)
2. MG Nagaraj - Researcher (Bangalore)

== Sports ==
1. Dattatreya Govinda Kulkarni (Dharwad)
2. Raghavendra Anvekar (Belagavi) - Para swimmer.

== Judiciary ==
1. Venkatachalapathy (Bangalore)
2. Nanjundereddy (Bangalore)

== Dance ==
1. Kamalaksha Acharya (South Kannada)

Amrita Mahotsava Rajyotsava Award of Independence-2022

1. Ramakrishna Ashram (Mysore)
2. Lingayat Progressive Organization (Gadag)
3. Agadi Tota (Haveri)
4. Thalassemia and Haemophilia Society (Bagalakote)
5. Amrita Shishu Niwas (Bangalore)
6. Sumana Foundation (Bangalore)
7. Yuva Vahini Organization (South Kannada)
8. Nele Foundation-Orphan Rehabilitation Center (Bangalore)
9. Nammane Summane - Refugee Ashram (Mangalmukhi Institute (Bangalore)
10. Uma Maheshwari Backward Classes Development Trust (MANDYA)
