= Madhavan Chandradathan =

Indian space scientist

M. C. Dathan
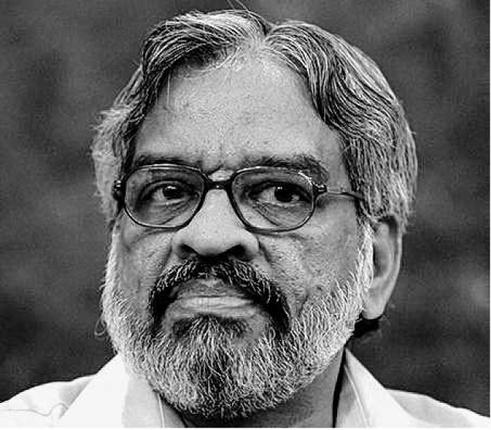
- Chandradathan in 2015
- Born: Varkala, Thiruvananthapuram, India
- Education: Birla Institute of Technology; Govt. Engg. College, Thrissur; SN College, Varkala
- Occupation: Space scientist
- Known for: Indian Space Program; Chandrayaan; Mars Orbiter Mission
- Awards: Padma Shri (2014)
- Scientific career
- Workplaces: Indian Space Research Organisation; VSSC; LPSC; SDSC; Government of Kerala

M. C. Dathan is an Indian space scientist and former director of the Vikram Sarabhai Space Centre (VSSC). The Government of India honoured him, in 2014, by awarding him the Padma Shri, the fourth highest civilian award, for his contributions to the fields of science and technology. In May 2016, the Government of Kerala appointed MC Dathan as the scientific advisor to chief minister.

== Biography ==
Madhavan Chandradathan was born to Madhavan and Vasumathy, in Varkala. He graduated in chemical engineering from the Government Engineering College, Thrissur in 1971 and secured a master's degree (MTech) from the Birla Institute of Technology in 1985.

Chandradathan started his career in 1972, by joining the Indian Space Research Organisation (ISRO) where he worked for the SLV-3 project, the development of solid propellant formulations. He also contributed to the realisation of solid motors for SLV-3, ASLV and PSLV projects. Later, Chandradathan took up the assignment of developing rocket nozzles primarily for solid motors. He became the head of the ablative nozzle production unit in 2000, where he remained till 2004. During this period, his team developed the flex nozzle for the S200 motor and the S200 booster for the GSLV Mk-III project.

He was promoted to Chief Executive of the Solid Propellant Plant (SPROB) for the PSLV and GSLV boosters. In this position, Chandradrathan oversaw the establishment of a new Solid Propellant Plant (SPP), which was commissioned in 2008.

Chandradathan became the Director of the Satish Dhawan Space Centre, SHAR (SDSC), in 2008. During his tenure as the Director, Chandradathan is reported to have contributed to the improvement of production levels of solid boosters. He is also credited with two ground tests for S200 segments of the GSLV Mk-III, expansion of the facilities, and the development of a new Mission Control Centre and Launch Control Centre.

In January 2013, he became the Director of the Liquid Propulsion Systems Centre (LPSC), which controlled the Thiruvananthapuram, Mahendragiri and Bangalore campuses of the ISRO. In June 2014, he was made the Director of the Vikram Sarabhai Space Centre (VSSC).

He was also the head of the launch authorisation board of Chandrayaan-1 project.

In May 2016, the Government of Kerala appointed MC Dathan as the scientific advisor to chief minister Pinarayi Vijayan.

== Honours ==
Chandradrathan is a recipient of many honours and awards, including Performance Excellence Award (2009) from ISRO, Outstanding Chemical Engineer Award (2009) from the Institution of Engineers (India) (IEI) and Individual Service Award (2006) from ISRO.

In 2014, the Government of India honoured him with the civilian award of Padma Shri.

Chandradathan has attended many seminars and conferences to give keynote addresses. He has also published many articles in such journals of repute as the International Astronautical Federation.

== See also ==
- Satish Dhawan Space Centre
- Indian Space Research Organisation
- Vikram Sarabhai Space Centre

Government offices
Preceded by S. Ramakrishnan	Director, Vikram Sarabhai Space Centre; 2014 - 2015	Succeeded by K. Sivan
