= Aeronautical Society =

The Aeronautical Society may refer to:

- Royal Aeronautical Society, known as the Aeronautical Society from 1866 to 1918
- Aeronautical Society of India
