= S. K. Majumdar (commodore) =

S. K. Majumdar সুধীন্দ্র কুমার মজুমদার
- Born: 8 October 1927 (British Raj) Patna, British India
- Died: 20 July 2011 (aged 83); New Delhi, India
- Military career
- Allegiance: (British Raj) British India; Republic of India
- Branch: Royal Indian Air Force; Indian Air Force
- Service years: 1945–1977
- Rank: Air Commodore
- Nickname: Maju
- Conflicts: World War II
- Awards: Sikorsky Pioneering Award (2004), Rotary Wing Society of India

Air Commodore Sudhindra Kumar Majumdar (Bengali:সুধীন্দ্র কুমার মজুমদার) (8 October 1927 – 20 July 2011) was an officer and helicopter pioneer in the Indian Air Force.

== Early life ==
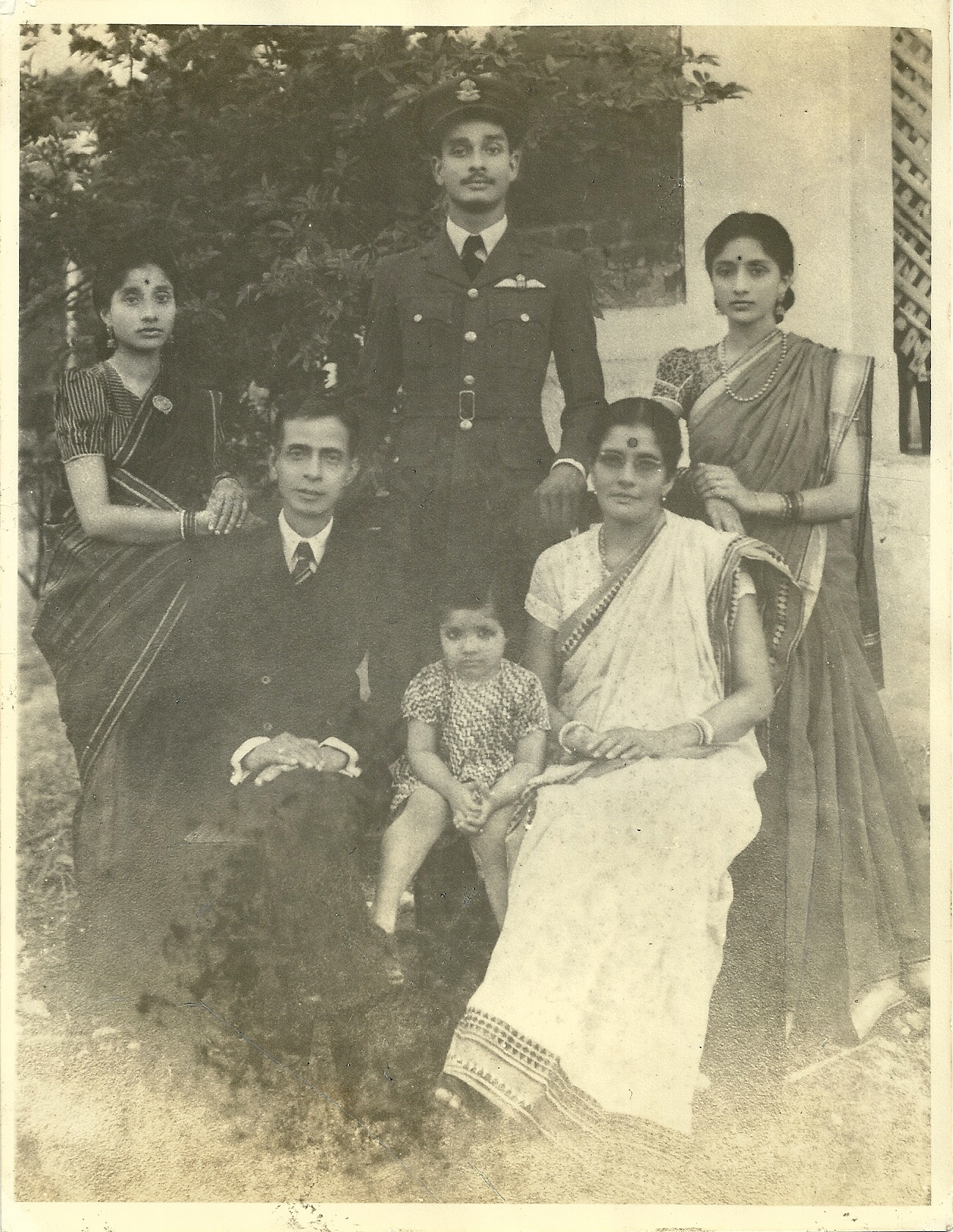
The Family in his young days - Patna, Bihar.

Majumdar was born on 7 October 1927 at Patna, Bihar, India. His parents were Shri. S. K. Majumdar, Bar-at-Law, and Smt. Jyoti Devi.

== Military career ==
=== Fixed-wing aircraft ===
Majumdar began his flying career with Royal Indian Air Force (RIAF). At the height of the Second World War in 1945, he was inducted in the RIAF. He received his ‘flying wings’ in 1948, and commissioned on 14 May as a Pilot Officer and Flying Officer, flying Hurricanes and Spitfires – in the halcyon days of the fledgling Air Force of newly independent India.

He continued flying fixed-wing craft with the Indian Air Force (the word "Royal" was dropped in 1950), prior to selection for helicopters in 1953.

=== Helicopters ===
When India decided to induct the Sikorsky S-55 helicopter for the IAF, then Flight Lieutenant S. K. Majumdar was selected to be sent to the United States along with Flight Lieutenant Neil Todd, for training, on the selected type for induction into the Indian Air Force.

During his long innings in the Indian Air Force, he achieved many firsts:

- First pilot in the Indian defence and para-military forces to fly the helicopter, an S-55 Sikorsky, in India (March 1954)
- First helicopter qualified flying instructor
- First to do an amphibious operation
- Founder of the helicopter training unit of the Indian Air Force
- First to carry out a rooftop landing (1959).

Apart from pioneering the concepts of usage of helicopter in India, he was a pioneer in mountain terrain operations. He "evolved concepts of mountain flying in erstwhile NEFA (Arunachal Pradesh), Assam, Nagaland and Jammu and Kashmir, and displayed an astonishing degree of dedication and professionalism."

After 29 years of distinguished service in the Indian Air Force, he retired in March 1977. 'Clients' during his Air Force time included former prime ministers Jawaharlal Nehru and Indira Gandhi. His career is also noteworthy for being accident-free.

In recognition of his yeoman service and pioneering work in the field of helicopter aviation, he was awarded Sikorsky Pioneering Award in 2004 by the Rotary Wing Society of India.

== Death ==
He died at age 83 at the Army Research and Referral Hospital in the Delhi Cantt section of New Delhi on the morning of 20 July 2011 due to a prolonged illness.
