= V. P. Sandlas =

Indian space scientist

- Born: Ved Prakash Sandlas; 22 February 1945; Samrala, India
- Died: 6 July 2017 (aged 72); New Delhi, India
- Occupations: Scientist, writer
- Years active: 1967–2017
- Notable work: The Leapfroggers: An Insider's Account of ISRO, Glimpses of Indian Engineering Achievements, Non-Ionizing EM Radiation Effects on Biological Systems

Ved Prakash Sandlas (22 February 1945 – 6 July 2017) was an Indian space scientist who worked with the Indian Space Research Organisation in its early days and headed the SLV-3 project during 1980–1984. He later worked with the Defence Research and Development Organisation till 2005. He was instrumental in setting up the Amity Institute of Space Science and Technology, and Amity Institute of Aerospace Engineering.

== Early life ==
Sandlas was born at Samrala in Punjab. He completed his Bachelor of Science in Physics (Honours) from University of Delhi and Bachelor of Technology in Electronics & Electrical Communication Engineering from Indian Institute of Technology Kharagpur.

== Career ==
Sandlas joined Vikram Sarabhai Space Centre in 1967 as a Project Engineer. During 1980–1984, he served as the Project and Mission Director of the SLV-3 project. After continuing at VSSC as a Group Director, he shifted to Defence Research and Development Organisation in 1986 where he headed the Defence Electronics Applications Laboratory (DEAL), Dehradun till 1996.

During 2008–13, he served as the Director General of Amity Institute of Space Science and Technology, and Amity Institute of Aerospace Engineering, Noida.

== Awards ==
- DRDO's ‘Scientist of the Year’ award (1988)
- FIE Foundation National Award (1998) for Science & Technology
- IIT Kharagpur Distinguished Alumnus Award (2012)
