= Reusable Launch Vehicle =

Reusable Launch Vehicle may refer to:

- 2nd Reusable Launch Vehicle program of NASA (including X-33), from 1994, major part of Space Launch Initiative
- RLV Technology Demonstration Programme of Indian Space Research Organisation to develop multiple reusable space launch vehicle.
- Reusable launch vehicles in general
