= P. V. Manoranjan Rao =

Indian physicist

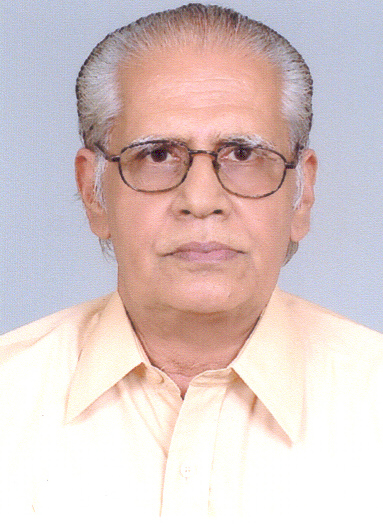
- Born: 7 December 1936 (age 89); Nellore
- Education: Doctor of Philosophy (University of Calcutta)
- Occupations: Scientist, writer
- Years active: 1962–present
- Notable work: Ever Upwards: ISRO in Images, From Fishing Hamlet To Red Planet, 50 Years of Space: A Global Perspective, A Brief History of Rocketry in ISRO

P. V. Manoranjan Rao is a veteran space scientist and author from India. In his career spanning over three decades — including over two decades at the Indian Space Research Organisation's Vikram Sarabhai Space Centre — he has done extensive research in areas including the physics of lightning discharge, ionospheric physics, magnetospheric physics, VLF and ELF wave propagation, electrostatics of launch vehicles, electrostatic charging of communications satellites, EMI/EMC and lightning protection for launch vehicles. He has edited and authored three books on India's space history.

== Early life ==
After completing his Bachelor of Science in Physics from Hindu College (Guntur), Andhra Pradesh in 1956, Manoranjan Rao did his Master of Science in Physics from Banaras Hindu University in 1958.

== Career ==
During 1959–1961, Manoranjan Rao did research in theoretical physics at the Indian Association for the Cultivation of Science in Kolkata. This was followed by research stints (1962–1968) on the physics of lightning at the University College of Science and Bose Institute under the eminent physicist Prof. Satish Ranjan Khastgir. In 1968, he was awarded a Doctor of Philosophy in Physics by the University of Calcutta. In 1969, he moved to Kuden-kenkyujo, Toyokawa, Japan to continue with his research on atmospheric electricity and lightning physics at the Nagoya University. After spending a year in Japan, Manoranjan Rao joined the National Physical Laboratory of India for a brief stint. Later, at Banaras Hindu University, he worked on whistler phenomenon, which led to his research on very low frequency (VLF) and extremely low frequency (ELF) propagation in the magnetosphere.

He left Banaras Hindu University in 1973 to join the Space Physics Division (SPD) at Vikram Sarabhai Space Centre (VSSC), Thiruvananthapuram.

He has 31 publications in various journals, Indian and international, and has authored 8 technical reports internal to the Vikram Sarabhai Space Centre. Over 20 of his articles have been published in newspapers and magazines, and he is quoted often in the media on matters related to the history of the ISRO.

He was the founder-editor of Countdown, the in-house journal of VSSC, and Space India, the in-house journal of the ISRO, from their inception until his retirement. He was also instrumental in reviving the ISRO's Space Museum in Thiruvananthapuram. He has written the script for over a dozen documentaries highlighting the VSSC's achievements. At the time of his retirement from theVSSC, he was part of VSSC Management Council, the apex body that works with the centre director in the overall management of the centre.

He retired from ISRO in 1996 as the Group Director of the Programme Planning and Evaluation Group at VSSC.

After his retirement from VSSC, he has worked on the lightning protection systems at STPI Earth Station, Technopark, Trivandrum and the Polar Satellite Launch Vehicle launchpad at Satish Dhawan Space Centre. He also continued with his contributions to ISRO's Space Museum even after retirement — he wrote the content for the museum display panels.

He was the Editor-in-Chief of 50 Years of Space: A Global Perspective, a publication that commemorated 50 years of the Sputnik 1 launch and the 58th International Astronautical Congress (Hyderabad, 2007). Along with P. Radhakrishnan, a former space scientist, Dr. Rao co-authored A Brief History of Rocketry in ISRO, published in 2012. This book won the Engineering Sciences Book award for 2014 from the Paris-based International Academy of Astronautics (IAA).

He was the Chief Editor of From Fishing Hamlet To Red Planet, a compendium of articles on the history of the Indian Space Research Organisation and its sequel Ever Upwards: ISRO in Images, both considered to be the authorized and official history of Indian Space Research Organisation.
