= Rohini (satellite) =

Series of Indian satellites

- Manufacturer: ISRO
- Country of origin: India
- Operator: ISRO
- Applications: Experimental Satellites

Specifications
- Launch mass: 30–41.5 kilograms (66–91 lb)
- Dimensions: 360
- Power: 3 watts (RTP); 16 watts (others)
- Equipment: Launch Vehicle monitor Solid State camera(RS-D2)
- Regime: 400km Circular Low Earth
- Design life: 8

Production
- Status: Retired
- Launched: 4
- Retired: 2
- Lost: 2
- Maiden launch: RTP; 10 August 1979 Rohini Satellite 1; 18 July 1980 (Successful)
- Last launch: Rohini RS-D2; 17 April 1983
- Last retirement: Rohini RS-D2

Related spacecraft
- Derived from: 6
- Derivatives: 5

Rohini is a series of satellites launched by ISRO. The Rohini series consisted of four satellites, each of which was launched by the Satellite Launch Vehicle (SLV) and three of which made it successfully to orbit. The series were mostly experimental satellites, with the first launch being in 1979. There was an earlier series of ISRO sounding rockets with the same name, first launched 1967.

== Satellites in series ==
=== Rohini Technology Payload (RTP) ===
It was a 35 kg (77 lb) experimental spin stabilized satellite that used 3W of power and was launched on 10 August 1979 from SDSC. The satellite contained instruments to monitor the launch vehicle. The satellite could not be placed into its intended orbit.

=== Rohini RS-1 ===
It was also a 35 kg (77 lb) experimental spin stabilized satellite that used 16W of power and was successfully launched on 18 July 1980 from Satish Dhawan Space Centre into an orbit of 305 km × 919 km (190 mi × 571 mi) with an inclination of 44.7°. It was the first satellite successfully launched by the indigenous launch vehicle SLV. This was India's first indigenous satellite launch, making it the seventh nation to possess the capability to launch its own satellites on its own rockets. It provided data on the fourth stage of SLV. The satellite had mission life of 1.2 years and an orbital life of 20 months.

=== Rohini RS-D1 ===
It was a 38 kg (84 lb) experimental spin stabilized satellite that used 16W of power and was launched on 31 May 1981. The launch of the SLV was a partial success as the satellite did not reach the intended height and thus it only stayed in orbit for 9 days. It achieved an orbit of 186 km × 418 km (116 mi × 260 mi) with an inclination of 46°. The satellite carried a solid state camera for remote sensing applications (Landmark Tracker) and performed to specifications.

=== Rohini RS-D2 ===
It was a 41.5 kg (91 lb) experimental spin stabilized satellite that used 16W of power and was launched successfully on 17 April 1983 into an orbit of 371 km × 861 km (231 mi × 535 mi) and an inclination of 46°. The satellite was in operation (mission life) for 17 months and its main payload, a smart sensor camera, took over 2500 pictures. The camera had the capability to take pictures both in visible and infrared bands. After an orbital life of 7 years, the satellite reentered the Earth atmosphere on 19 April 1990.

== See also ==
- List of Indian satellites
