= From Fishing Hamlet To Red Planet =

2015 book

From Fishing Hamlet to Red Planet: India's Space Journey
- Book cover
- Language: English
- Genre: Science
- Publisher: HarperCollins
- Publication date: 28 December 2015
- Publication place: India
- Pages: 736
- ISBN: 978-9351776895

From Fishing Hamlet to Red Planet: India's Space Journey edited by P. V. Manoranjan Rao, B. N. Suresh and V. P. Balagangadharan — all of them former scientists of the Indian Space Research Organization — is a book that traces the history of India's space organization, Indian Space Research Organization.

Its sequel—Ever Upwards: ISRO in Images—a coffee table book on ISRO's history was published in 2019. These two books are considered to be the most authoritative and official history of the Indian Space Research Organisation—the only history books to have been authorized by the space organization.
