= Ramadas P. Shenoy =

Indian radar scientist (1929 - 2012)

- Born: 28 April 1929; Mangalore, India
- Died: 16 August 2012 (aged 83); Bangalore, India
- Occupation: Defence scientist
- Known for: Radar technology
- Spouse: Smt. Amita R Shenoy
- Children: Vinata Naik, Leena Bhat, Asima Souda
- Awards: Padma Shri IETE-IRSI Award; Aryabhatta Award
- Website: www.rpshenoy.com

Ramadas Panemangalore Shenoy (26 April 1929 – 16 August 2012) was an Indian defence scientist and writer, known for his contributions in the field of radar technology. He secured a doctoral degree in electrical engineering from the University of Wisconsin–Madison and joined Defence Research and Development Organization in 1961, involving himself with the indigenous development of radar technology till his retirement, as a Distinguished Scientist, in 1989.

A fellow of the Indian National Academy of Engineering and a Distinguished Fellow of the Institution of Electronics and Telecommunication Engineers, Shenoy served as a visiting professor at the Indian Institute of Science, Bengaluru. He is credited with several publications and his book, Defence Research and Development Organisation, 1958-1982 details the history military research at the organization. He is a recipient of the IETE-IRSI Award and Aryabhatta Award. The Government of India awarded him the fourth highest civilian honour of Padma Shri in 1987.

== Early life and education ==
Shenoy, also known as Ramadas Panemangalore Shenoy, was born to Mrs. P. Sanjivi Shenoy and Mr. Panemangalore Narasimha Shenoy in Mangalore, Karnataka, India, on 28 April 1929.

Shenoy started his schooling at Canara High School, Mangalore, Karnataka, India, and went to attend BSc physics at Presidency College, University of Madras, Tamil Nadu, India. Thereafter, he moved to Banaras Hindu University, Varnasi, Uttar Pradesh, India for his Post Graduation in Physics. He completed his post graduate diploma in electrical communication engineering from the prestigious Indian Institute of Science (IISc), Bangalore, Karnataka, India, before moving to the University of Wisconsin, USA for his PhD in Electrical Engineering.

== Career ==
After completing his PhD in 1957, he worked for 3 years in TV and Broadcasting Division of Radio Corporation of America at Camden, New Jersey, US, and then returned to Bangalore, Karnataka, India, in 1960.

With his leadership and managerial skills, he played several roles with Electronics and Radar Development Establishment (LRDE) from 1960 to 1987, including the role of director from 1973 to 1987.

He worked as a scientist in the following:

- Electronics and Radar Development Establishment (LRDE), Bangalore, Karnataka, India - a unit under the Defence Research and Development Organisation (DRDO), Ministry of Defence (1960-1967)
- Deputy Director, Defence Research & Development Laboratory (DLRL), Hyderabad, Andhra Pradesh, India - a unit under the Defence Research and Development Organisation (DRDO) (1967-1971)
- Deputed as Chief Technical Officer to Bharat Electronics Limited (BEL), Ghaziabad, Uttar Pradesh, India - for Development of New Generation Radars to the Indian Air Force (1971-1973)

He has contributed significantly to radar technology and was also part of some of the most successful projects during his tenure in LRDE.

Directorship on other Boards –

- NALTECH Pvt. Ltd, Bangalore, Karnataka, India: Director (1993-2006)
- ASM Technologies Limited, Bangalore, Karnataka, India : Director (1993-2002, 2006–2012)
- Astra Microwave Products Limited, Hyderabad, Andhra Pradesh, India : Chairman (1995-2009)
- Board of Director for Public Sector Units in India such as Bharat Electronics Limited (BEL), Hindustan Teleprinters Limited, Karnataka State Electronics Development Corporation Limited (KEONICS) and Electronics Corporation of Tamil Nadu (ELCOT)

Shenoy has been with the Indian Institute of Science, Bangalore, Karnataka, India, since 1990 as a visiting professor and with the Jawaharlal Nehru Center for Advanced Scientific Research, Bangalore, Karnataka, India, since 1993.

== Death ==
Shenoy died on 16 August 2012 at Bangalore.

== Area of expertise ==
His areas of expertise included electronics engineering, microwave engineering, radar and communication technology, encryption and restricted access systems, with specific emphasis on defence applications and associated electronic warfare, microwave tubes.

== Published works ==
- Advanced Radar Techniques & Systems
- IETE: The First Four Decades
- Defence Research and Development Organisation (1958-1982)

== Awards and achievements ==
- Padma Shri, 1987, one of the highest civilian awards in India
- VASVIK Research Award (1983) - Electrical and Electronic Sciences and Technology
- IETE-IRSI Award (1985) for Pioneering Radar Development in India
- Aryabhata Award (2000) for promoting Astronautics in India
- Distinguished Alumnus (2000) Indian Institute of Science, Bangalore
- DRDO Lifetime Achievement Award (2001)
- Vacuum Electronic Devices & Applications Society Lifetime Achievement Award (2006)
- Fellow of Indian National Academy of Engineering & Distinguished Fellow of IETE

== Dr. R.P. Shenoy award for Excellence in Science ==
ASM Technologies Ltd. instituted the “Dr. R. P. Shenoy award for Excellence in Science” in memory of its former director, Late Dr. R. P. Shenoy, a Distinguished Scientist of Defence Research & Development Organization (DRDO) of the Government of India. The award is extended to 8th and 9th grade students of Kendriya Vidyalaya, DRDO complex, Bangalore, who have secured A1 grade in Science.

== Bibliography ==
- Advanced Radar Techniques & Systems
- IETE: The First Four Decades
- Defence Research and Development Organisation (1958-1982)

== See also ==
- Radar
- Defence Research and Development Organisation
