= S. K. Majumdar =

Personal details
- Spouse: Jyoti
- Children: Gauri, Sudhindra & Roma.
- Profession: Barrister

S. K. Majumdar was one of Patna High Court's leading lawyers, who primarily practiced at the Supreme Court of India and the Patna High Court. Majumdar was a well-known practitioner of income tax laws.

== Early life ==
The youngest son of Raj Kumar Majumdar, an inspecting director in the Education Department of India, S. K. Majumdar started his educational life as a science student. However, he took up the study of law and became a pleader in Dacca. He decided to go to England and was called to Middle Temple on 15 May 1924.

== Legal acumen ==
His preferred field was income tax laws, and his clients included well-known princes, zamindars and other established landowners in the former state of Bihar.

Although a barrister in his own right, he is remembered more for his biographical works on Mohandas K. Gandhi, Muhammad Ali Jinnah and Subhas Chandra Bose. His books include Evolution of Netaji, The Warrior Prophet of India.

His seminal work Jinnah and Gandhi is a suggested reading for M.Phil. and PhD courses in the University of Peshawar for Indo-Pakistan relationships.

== Family ==
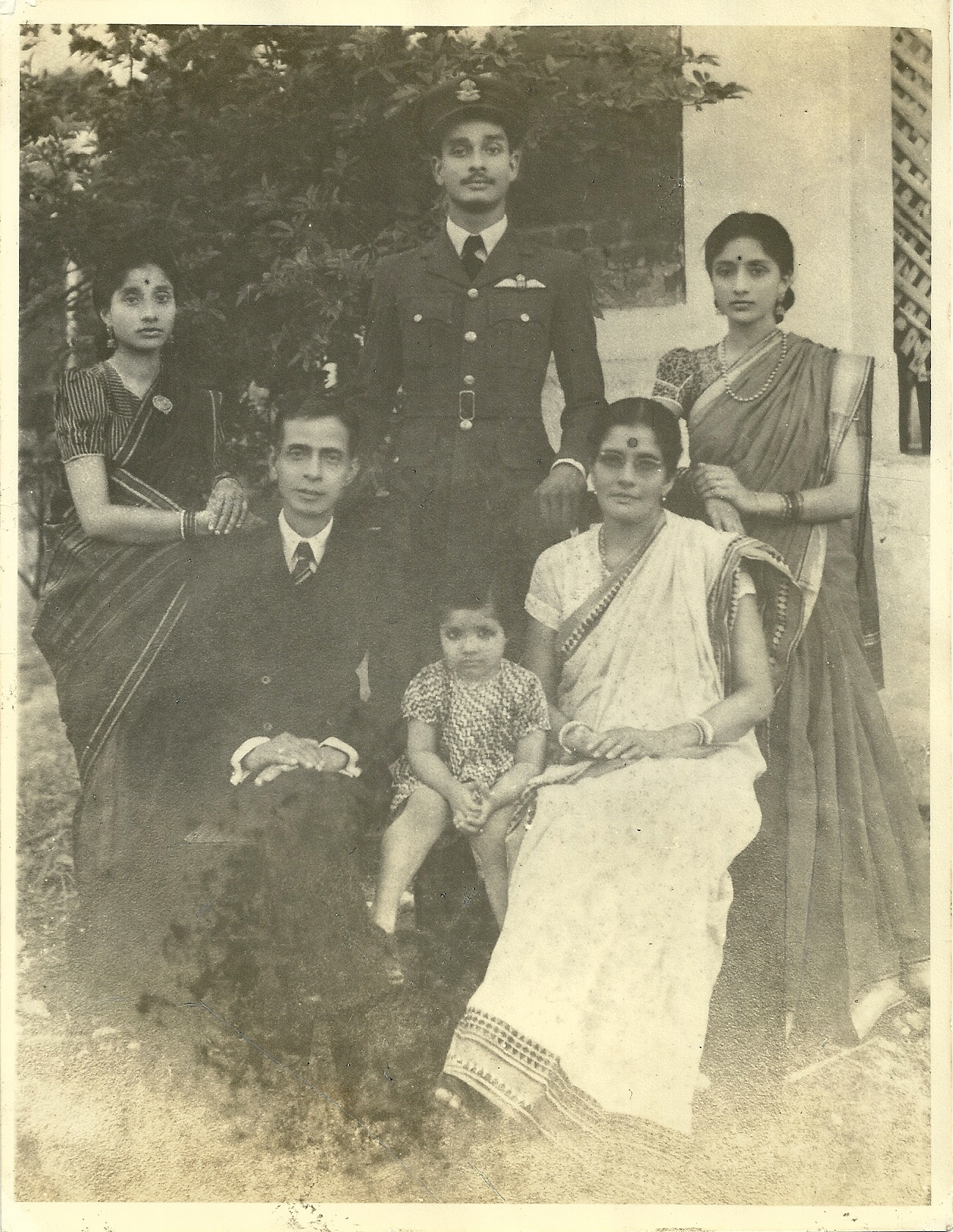
Family picture - Patna, Bihar

When he died in 1979, he was survived by his wife, Jyotilata Majumdar, a son, Air Commodore S K Majumdar and two daughters, Gauri Bhattacharyya and Roma Mukherjee.
