= Ever Upwards: ISRO in Images =

2019 book by P. V. Manoranjan Rao, B. N. Suresh, and V. P. Balagangadharan

- Book cover
- Language: English
- Genre: Science
- Publisher: Orient Blackswan
- Publication date: July 2019
- Publication place: India
- Pages: 304
- ISBN: 9789389211139

Ever Upwards: ISRO in Images by P. V. Manoranjan Rao, B. N. Suresh and V. P. Balagangadharan — all of them former scientists of the Indian Space Research Organization — is a coffee table book on the history of the Indian Space Research Organisation.

The book, with over 350 photos, is the sequel of From Fishing Hamlet To Red Planet, published in 2015. These two books are considered to be the most authoritative and official history of the Indian Space Research Organisation—the only history books to have been authorized by the space organization.

In its review, Open Magazine wrote that this: "As a showcase of ISRO's past and present, produced by three stalwarts with intimate knowledge of the organisation, this coffee-table book is a keeper."
