= Pramod Kale =

Indian engineer

- Born: 4 March 1941 (age 84); Pune, India
- Education: • Maharaja Sayajirao University of Baroda (BSc) • Gujarat University (MSc)
- Occupation: Space Research Scientist
- Organisation(s): • Physical Research Laboratory • Indian Space Research Organisation
- Honours: • Padma Shri (1984) • Aryabhata Award (2006)

Pramod Kale (born 4 March 1941) is an Indian engineer who has worked for the Indian Space Research Organisation in various leadership roles.

== Early life and education ==
He was born on 4 March 1941 in Pune, India. Kale completed his matriculation in 1956 from the M.C. High School, Vadodara and went on to study at Fergusson College in Pune. He completed his BSc Physics from Maharaja Sayajirao University of Baroda in 1960 and then his MSc (Physics-Electronics) from Gujarat University, Ahmedabad in 1962.

== Career ==
While studying for his MSc he worked at the Physical Research Laboratory (PRL), Ahmedabad for getting practical experience of Electronics and Space Research. During that time he started work on Satellite tracking. After getting his MSc in 1962, he worked for three years as a research student of Vikram Sarabhai. In 1963 he was selected as a team member for the establishment of Thumba Equatorial Rocket Launching Station (TERLS), near Thiruvananthapuram and for that work was deputed to work at Goddard Space Flight Centre, NASA, USA.

== Awards ==
- Shri Hari Om Ashram Prerit Vikram Sarabhai Award for System Analysis and Management Problems, 1975
- Padma Shri, Government of India, 1984
- Shri R L Wadhawa Gold Medal of Institution of Electronics and Telecommunications Engineers 1991
- Bharat Jyoti Award presented by Front for National Progress 1999
- Aryabhata Award, presented by the Astronautical Society of India in recognition of lifetime contribution to the promotion of astronautics, 2006

== Publications ==
Kale has published over twenty-five papers on various subjects from 1964 until 1994.

Government offices
Preceded by Suresh Chandra Gupta	Director, Vikram Sarabhai Space Centre; 1994 - 1994	Succeeded by S. Srinivasan
