= Rohini Satellite 1 =

First satellite launched entirely by India

Rohini 1
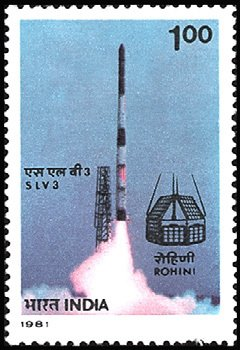
- Stamp issued depicting the launch of SLV-3 and Rohini satellite
- Mission type: Earth observation
- Operator: ISRO
- COSPAR ID: 1980-062A
- Website: https://www.isro.gov.in/
- Mission duration: 1.2 years (operational), remained in orbit for 20 months

Spacecraft properties
- Spacecraft: RS-1
- Manufacturer: Indian Space Research Organisation
- Launch mass: 35 kg (77 lb)
- Dimensions: 0.7m long, 0.6m diameter
- Power: 16 W

Start of mission
- Launch date: 18 July 1980, 8:04 AM IST (2:34 AM GST)
- Rocket: Satellite Launch Vehicle, SLV-3
- Launch site: Satish Dhawan Space Centre
- Contractor: Indian Space Research Organisation
- Entered service: July 1980

End of mission
- Disposal: atmospheric re-entry
- Deactivated: 20 May 1981

Orbital parameters
- Reference system: Geocentric orbit
- Regime: Low Earth orbit
- Perigee altitude: 305 km (190 mi)
- Apogee altitude: 919 km (571 mi)
- Inclination: 44.7°
- Period: 96.90 minutes

Instruments
- Digital sun sensor, Magnetometer and temperature sensors

Rohini Satellite 1 or RS-1 is the first satellite successfully launched by India using indigenously developed rockets. After the launch on 18 July 1980 by a SLV rocket, India became the 7th country to have rocket launching capability.

The satellite was spin-stabilised and provided data regarding the fourth stage of SLV rocket.

== Launch ==
Launched 8:04 AM IST from Satish Dhawan Space Centre, it was the first successful orbital launch from the centre. It achieved orbit 305 km × 919 km (190 mi × 571 mi) with an inclination of 44.7°, 8 minutes after the launch. It was launched after the failure of the first two SLV launches. The SLV rocket consisted of 25 km wiring, containing a million connections. 44 major systems and 250 subsystems were in the rocket. Individual components numbered about 100,000, and included almost 40,000 fasteners. At the time of launch, it weighed 17 tonnes and had a height of 22 meters.

The vehicle's trajectory was monitored by four long and medium range radars. Long-range Interferometer and optical line theodolites also aided in tracking. Four computer systems received trajectory information from the tracking sources and processed the data simultaneously. They displayed the vehicle's path on monitors in the range safety room of the control centre. Sriharikota, Car Nicobar, Trivandrum and Ahmedabad centres joined in to provide tracking and telemetry support for the satellite. Mediapersons were not allowed to the space centre during the launch. Many viewed the launch and the 5 km high white smoke from afar.

== Design ==
The satellite had a weight of 35 kg, and was spin stabilized. It carried instruments such as digital Sun sensor, Magnetometer and temperature sensors atop a structure made out of Aluminium Alloy. It carried solar panels to produce 16W of electricity. It used a VHF band for communications. It provided data on the fourth stage of SLV. The satellite had mission life of 1.2 years and an orbital life of 20 months. It was planned to have a lifespan of 100 days.
