= Vasant R. Gowariker =

Indian scientist (1933–2015)

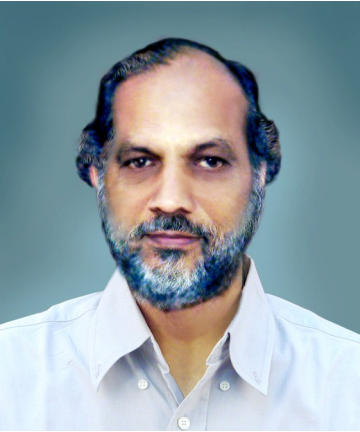
- Vasant Ranchhod Gowariker
- Born: 25 March 1933; Poona, Bombay Presidency, British India (present day Maharashtra, India)
- Died: 2 January 2015 (aged 81); Pune, Maharashtra, India
- Occupation: Scientist
- Spouse: Sudha Gowariker
- Children: Irawati, Ashwini, Kalyani

Vasant Ranchhod Gowariker (25 March 1933 – 2 January 2015) was an Indian scientist. He was a director in the Indian Space Research Organization and also the scientific advisor to the Prime Minister of India from 1991 to 1993. Gowariker made valuable contributions to the fields of space research, weather and population. He was well known for his monsoon forecast model as he was the first scientist to develop an indigenous weather forecasting model that predicted the monsoon correctly.

== Early life ==
Gowariker was born in Poona, British India on 25 March 1933 in Maharashtrian family. After his schooling and graduation from Kolhapur district in Western Maharashtra, he embarked on his scientific odyssey to England in the early 1950s. He obtained his M.Sc. and Ph.D. in chemical engineering, supervised by F. H. Garner. His collaboration resulted in the Garner-Gowariker theory, which was a novel analysis of heat and mass transfer between solids and fluid.

== Career ==
He had worked with the Indian Space Research Organisation. Gowariker was involved in space research in early career under Vikram Sarabhai when his office was in the building of the local St Mary Magdalene Church in Thumba in Kerala. He pioneered solid propellant development and later served as Director of the Vikram Sarabhai Space Centre (VSSC) between 1979 and 1985.

Gowariker also served as the scientific advisor to Prime Minister of India P.V. Narasimha Rao from 1991 to 1993. He had also been the Secretary of Department of Science and Technology.

He was appointed as Vice-Chancellor, Pune University and was chairman of the Marathi Vidnyan Parishad between 1994 and 2000. Gowariker, along with his associates, also compiled The Fertilizer Encyclopedia (2008) that featured 4,500 entries detailing the chemical composition of fertilizers, and containing information on everything from their manufacturing and application to their economic and environmental considerations.

== Death ==
Gowarikar died on 2 January 2015 at Deenanath Mangeshkar Hospital, Pune, India following dengue and urinary tract infections.

Government offices
Preceded by Brahm Prakash	Director, Vikram Sarabhai Space Centre; 1979 - 1985	Succeeded by Suresh Chandra Gupta
