= A Brief History of Rocketry in ISRO =

- Book cover
- Language: English
- Genre: Science
- Publisher: Orient Blackswan
- Publication date: 2012
- Publication place: India
- Pages: 391
- ISBN: 9788173717642

A Brief History of Rocketry in ISRO by P. V. Manoranjan Rao and P. Radhakrishnan — both former scientists of the Indian Space Research Organization — is a book on the history of rocketry in the Indian Space Research Organisation.

Published in 2012, the book was released by space scientist and former President of India A. P. J. Abdul Kalam.
