= Aryabhata Award =

Indian aerospace award

- Individual award for notable contributions to astronautics
- Sponsored by: Astronautical Society of India, Minister of State (Prime Minister's Office)
- Rewards: ₹1 lakh (equivalent to ₹1.5 lakh or US$1,600 in 2026) and an award citation

The Aryabhata Award or Aryabhatta Award is an annual award, presented to individuals with notable lifetime contributions in the field of astronautics and aerospace technology in India.

It was instituted by the Astronautical Society of India (ASI) (established 1990), an International Astronautical Federation member since 1958. The award is usually presented by the Minister of State of the Prime Minister's Office, and consists of a citation and ₹1 lakh (₹100,000).

== History ==
The award is named after the fifth century Indian astronomer and mathematician Aryabhata, and in commemoration of the first Indian satellite Aryabhata (launched 19 April 1975).

== Award winners ==
- P. D. Bhavsar (1999)
- R.P. Shenoy (2000)
- Roddam Narasimha (2004)
- P.S. Goel (2005)
- Pramod Kale (2006)
- A. E. Muthunayagam (2010)
- V. K. Saraswat (2011)
- Ranganath R. Navalgund (2012)
- Avinash Chander (2016)

== See also ==
- List of astronomy awards
- List of engineering awards
- List of physics awards
- List of space technology awards
