= S. Unnikrishnan Nair =

Indian aerospace engineer

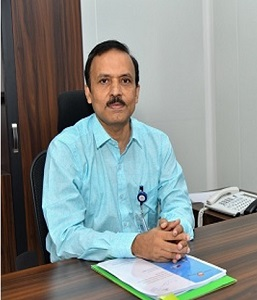

Director of Vikram Sarabhai Space Centre and Indian Institute of Space Science and Technology
- Incumbent
- Assumed office 7 February 2022
- Preceded by: S. Somanath

Director of Human Space Flight Centre
- In office January 2019 – 7 February 2022
- Preceded by: Position Established
- Succeeded by: Umamaheswaran R

Personal details
- Education: Mar Athanasius College of Engineering (B. Tech) Indian Institute of Science, Bengaluru (M.Tech., Aerospace Engineering) IIT Madras (PhD in Mechanical Engineering)

S. Unnikrishnan Nair is an Indian aerospace engineer presently serving as the director of Vikram Sarabhai Space Centre (VSSC). He is known for his works in the field of launch vehicle design, Space Capsule Recovery Experiment (SRE), and Human Spaceflight Programme. Prior to his directorship of VSSC, he was Director of Human Space Flight Centre, Bengaluru.

== Early life and education ==
S. Unnikrishnan Nair was born to Sreedharan Nair, who was an employee at the Kottayam Survey Office, and Rajamma.

Nair received his B.Tech. degree in Mechanical Engineering from Mar Athanasius College of Engineering affiliated to Kerala University, ME in Aerospace Engineering from IISc, Bengaluru, and Ph.D. in Mechanical Engineering from IIT Madras, Chennai.

== Career ==
Nair joined VSSC in 1985. He is currently the director of Vikram Sarabhai Space Centre.

He held the additional charge of the director at the Indian Institute of Space Science and Technology from 2022 to 2024.

== Personal life ==
S. Unnikrishnan Nair is married to Jaya G Nair, a former computer engineer at VSSC. The couple has two daughters.

== Awards and honors ==
- ISRO Team Excellence Award for his contributions to SRE.
