= Aeronautical Society of India =

- Formation: 1948

Aeronautical Society of India (AeSI) is the principal society in India serving the professions in areas of aeronautics, aerospace and aviation. Its stated primary purpose is to "advance the sciences, engineering, technology and management of aerospace, aeronautics and aviation and to foster and promote the professionalism of those engaged in these pursuits".

== History ==
The Aeronautical Society of India a professional body, devoted to advancement of aeronautical sciences and engineering in India, was founded in 1948. Pandit Jawaharlal Nehru was the first Patron-in-Chief of the Society.

The Society has more than 14000 members drawn from all major aeronautical establishments such as Defence Research & Development Establishments, Hindustan Aeronautics Limited, DGCA, Academic Institutions, Aeronautical Development Agency, Indian Air Force, Indian Space Research Organization, Vikram Sarabhai Space Centre, National Airports Authority of India, Air India, Pawn Hans and private airlines. Most of the organizations / industries in this field in this country and abroad are Corporate Members of the Society.

Currently Dr. G. Satheesh Reddy, Former Chairman of DRDO & Scientific Adviser to Raksha Mantri is the President of the Aeronautical Society of India.

== Objectives ==
The objectives of the Society are to promote the advancement and diffusion of the knowledge of aeronautical sciences and aircraft engineering and the elevation of the aeronautical profession.

The Aeronautical Society of India is the only forum in the country that provides intense interaction between professionals from all facets of civil and military aviation as well as the manufacturing/training/maintenance agencies. Over the years, the Aeronautical Society of India has generated large pool of aviation manpower through non-formal education and training programmes. .

== Affiliation ==
1. Ministry of Human Resource Development (MHRD) [Approval Revoked on 31 May 2013, prior to this date approved by MHRD].

2. AICTE (All India Council For Technical Education) [Received approval on 31 October 2017 for Members registered on or before 31 May 2013].

3. IITs (Indian Institute of Technology) for MTech through GATE (Graduate Aptitude Test in Engineering).

== Activities ==
The Society's activities include fraternization among professionals, promotion of aeronautical activities and policy and increased awareness of indigenous / international information/events through lectures, workshops and seminars.

The Society also conducts examinations in aeronautical engineering twice a year. A pass in this examination has been recognized by the Central Government in the Ministry of education as being equivalent to a degree in Aerospace Engineering from an Indian University. Approximately 50 candidates professional graduate every year. The Society is thus rendering a yeoman's service by giving an opportunity to the young to acquire in Aerospace field without straining the educational system and providing flexibility to students to undertake this on a time flexibility basis. It also provides a centralized library facility to its members and students.

The Society publishes a quarterly journal containing Research Papers, Technical Papers, Full length Papers and Students papers on various facets of aeronautical and Aerospace sciences and a Monthly Newsletter.

The Society conducts an Annual Essay competition to recognize and encourage talent among students, engineers and scientist.

The Society also confers a number of awards annually for contributions in fundamental / applied research in the field of aeronautics and space.

The society also conduct international conference about manufacturing, R&D with major aerospace companies such as Rolls-Royce, Airbus, and Boeing. A national conference is offered to have better industry interaction, mostly in Bangalore, Mumbai and Delhi.

The society also partly fund to the Indian student who want to release their paper worldwide with technical support.

== Organisation ==
The Society is managed by a Council consisting of a President, President-Elect, Seven Vice Presidents, the Honorary Secretary General, Honorary Treasurer and fifteen Members, twelve of whom are elected and the other three nominated to represent special interests.

=== First Council of the Aeronautical Society of India (year 1948) ===
Patron-in Chief	Jawaharlal Nehru
President	N.C. Ghosh
Vice Presidents	V.M. Ghatage H.M. Wadia
Hon. Secretary	P. Nilakantan
Hon. Treasurer	S.C. Sen
Members	B.C Carter Capt. L.M Manila GP. Capt. Harjinder Singh D. Narayanamurti R.N. Kathju K.K. Ray R.R. Krishna Rao M.B Sarwate Avhisek Kumar

=== President ===
Dr. G. Satheesh Reddy, former Chairman DRDO & Scientific Adviser to Raksha Mantri

== Membership examination ==
The AeSI conducts Associate Membership Examination twice a year. In which applicant has to clear a minimum 10 level of Section-A and 10 level of Section- B with training, Internship & projects of this examination which is recognized by the Ministry of Education, at par with a bachelor's degree (BS) in Aerospace Engineering of university from India.

This degree is recognized at par with British Bachelor Honors Degree in Engineering from Accredited UK University. Also Aeronautical Society of India (AeSI) have MoU with Royal Aeronautical Society (RAes) to have higher degree co-operation between professional bodies.

== See also ==
- Rotary Wing Society of India
