= Brahm Prakash =

Indian nuclear metallurgist

- Born: 21 August 1912; Lahore, British India
- Died: 3 January 1984 (aged 71); India
- Education: Punjab University; Massachusetts Institute of Technology
- Known for: Nuclear materials metallurgy; leadership in India's atomic energy and space programmes
- Awards: Padma Shri (1961); Padma Bhushan (1968); Shanti Swarup Bhatnagar Prize (1963)
- Scientific career
- Fields: Metallurgy
- Workplaces: Indian Institute of Science; Atomic Energy Establishment; Vikram Sarabhai Space Centre

Brahm Prakash (21 August 1912 – 3 January 1984) was an Indian metallurgist who made foundational contributions to nuclear materials and India's atomic energy programme, and later played a key leadership role in the development of the Indian space programme as the first Director of the Vikram Sarabhai Space Centre.

== Biography ==
Born in Lahore (now in Pakistan), Brahm Prakash studied chemistry and completed his doctoral research in 1942 in physical metallurgy at Punjab University. He subsequently worked with Shanti Swarup Bhatnagar as a post-doctoral researcher, and later pursued advanced training at the Massachusetts Institute of Technology, where he specialized in mineral engineering and metallurgical thermodynamics. He completed his second PhD programme under the mentorship of John Chipman, Morris Cohen, Antoine Marc Gaudin, and Reinhardt Schuhmann Jr., specializing in Mineral Engineering and Metallurgical Thermodynamics.

== Career ==
After returning to India, Prakash joined the atomic energy programme under Homi J. Bhabha and contributed to the development of nuclear materials and fuel technologies. In 1951, he became the first Indian head of the Department of Metallurgy at the Indian Institute of Science, where he expanded teaching and research programmes in metallurgy.

From 1957 to 1972, he held key roles in India's atomic energy establishment, including work on nuclear fuel fabrication and metallurgical processes.

In 1972, Prakash was appointed the first Director of the Vikram Sarabhai Space Centre (VSSC) in Thiruvananthapuram, following the death of Vikram Sarabhai. He led the consolidation of multiple research units into a unified centre and played an important role in the early development of India's launch vehicle and space research programmes. He served in this role until 1979 and remained a member of the Space Commission until his death in 1984.

== Research ==
Brahm Prakash's research focused on the metallurgy of materials relevant to nuclear energy, including the processing and properties of zirconium and other reactor materials. He played a key role in the development of technologies for the separation of zirconium and hafnium and in the fabrication of nuclear fuel materials for India's atomic energy programme.

His work contributed to the establishment of metallurgical processes and infrastructure required for nuclear reactor development, including fuel fabrication and materials production. Prakash's research helped lay the foundation for India's nuclear materials programme and advanced the application of physical metallurgy to atomic energy systems.

== Awards ==
Prakash received the 'Padma Shri', India's fourth highest civilian honour, in 1961 and the 'Padma Bhushan', India's third highest civilian honour, in 1968 for his contributions to science and engineering. He received the Shanti Swarup Bhatnagar Prize for engineering sciences in 1963.

Government offices
New title First holder	Director, Vikram Sarabhai Space Centre; 1972 - 1979	Succeeded by Vasant R. Gowariker
