= Sundaram Ramakrishnan =

Indian space scientist

- Occupation: Space scientist
- Awards: Padma Shri

Sundaram Ramakrishnan was an Indian space scientist and a former director of Vikram Sarabhai Space Centre, who is known to have contributed to the development of Polar Satellite Launch Vehicle (PSLV). He has served the Indian Space Research Organization for over 40 years.

Ramakrishnan, who is credited with several scientific papers on space science, was honoured by the Government of India in 2003 with the Padma Shri, the fourth-highest Indian civilian award.
