= B. N. Suresh =

Indian scientist

Byrana Nagappa Suresh (born 12 November 1943) is an Indian aerospace scientist. He serves as chancellor of the Indian Institute of Space Science and Technology (IIST) in Thiruvananthapuram and is a professor at ISRO Headquarters.

== Early life and education ==
Suresh's father was an agriculturist in Hosakere, Andagar, a small village near Koppa, situated near Sringeri in Karnataka, India. He attended his entire schooling in Andagar and Koppa and studied in Kannada medium. After Suresh earned his bachelor's degree in science in 1963 and engineering in 1967 from Mysore University, he took his master's degree in mechanical engineering from Indian Institute of Technology Madras in 1969. He completed his doctorate in control systems from Salford University, in 1978.

== Career ==
He was president of the Indian National Academy of Engineering (INAE) in Delhi from 2015 to 2018 and director of the Vikram Sarabhai Space Centre (VSSC) in Thiruvananthapuram from 2003 to 2007, where he contributed to the development of Indian launch vehicles and the Space Capsule Recovery Experiments (SRE), as well as research and development management.

Suresh was also the founding director of the IIST, a position he held until his retirement in November 2010. Following his retirement, he served as the Vikram Sarabhai Distinguished Professor at ISRO Headquarters for five years. Additionally, he was a professor at IIT Mumbai and MIT Manipal for three years. He was a member of the Board of Governors at IIT Madras for seven years, until July 2018, and later became vice chair for the Design Division of the Aeronautical Society of India. He contributed as an associate editor of the book From Fishing Hamlet To Red Planet and co-authored Ever Upwards: ISRO in Images, both of which document the history of the Indian Space Research Organisation (ISRO).

Suresh is president of the Jnanadeepa Senior Secondary School and the Sri Aurobindo Foundation for Education in Shivamogga, Karnataka.

Suresh has received several honors, including the Padma Bhushan in 2013 and the Padma Shri in 2002. He also received the Aryabhata Award from the Astronautical Society of India in 2009.

== Selected bibliography ==
=== Articles ===
- Shine, S.R.; Sunil Kumar, S.; Suresh, B.N. (2012). "A new generalised model for liquid film cooling in rocket combustion chambers". International Journal of Heat and Mass Transfer. 55 (19–20): 5065–5075. Bibcode:2012IJHMT..55.5065S. doi:10.1016/j.ijheatmasstransfer.2012.05.006.
- Gupta, S.; Suresh, B. N.; Sivan, K. (2007). "Evolution of Indian launch vehicle technologies". Current Science. 93 (12): 1697–1714. JSTOR 24102066.
- Shine, S. R.; Kumar, S. Sunil; Suresh, B. N. (2012). "Internal Wall-Jet Film Cooling with Straight Cylindrical Holes". Journal of Thermophysics and Heat Transfer. 26 (3): 439–449. doi:10.2514/1.T3847. ISSN 0887-8722.
- Suresh, B.N.; Sivan, K. (2015). Integrated Design for Space Transportation System. New Delhi: Springer India. doi:10.1007/978-81-322-2532-4. ISBN 978-81-322-2531-7.
- Suresh, B.N. (2009). "Roadmap of Indian space transportation". Acta Astronautica. 64 (4): 395–402. Bibcode:2009AcAau..64..395S. doi:10.1016/j.actaastro.2008.09.009.
- Shine, S. R.; Sunil Kumar, S.; Suresh, B. N. (2012). "Influence of coolant injector configuration on film cooling effectiveness for gaseous and liquid film coolants". Heat and Mass Transfer. 48 (5): 849–861. Bibcode:2012HMT....48..849S. doi:10.1007/s00231-011-0936-z. ISSN 0947-7411. S2CID 119561918.

=== Books ===
- Suresh, B.N. (2015). Integrated Design for Space Transportation System. New Delhi: Springer India. ISBN 978-81-322-2532-4. OCLC 1194490782.
- Suresh, B. N. (2021). Space and beyond : professional voyage of K. Kasturirangan. Singapore. ISBN 978-981-336-510-0. OCLC 1247939545.
- Rao, P. V. Manoranjan; Suresh, B. N.; Balagangadharan, V. P. (17 July 2019). Ever Upwards: ISRO in Images. Universities Press.

Government offices
Preceded by G. Madhavan Nair	Director, Vikram Sarabhai Space Centre; 2003 - 2007	Succeeded by K. Radhakrishnan
