= Vallan Kumaran Vilai =

Vallankumaranvilai
- village
- Location within Tamil Nadu Location within India
- Coordinates: 8°9′12″N 77°25′58″E
- Country: India
- State: Tamil Nadu
- District: Kanyakumari
- Time zone: UTC+5:30

Vallan Kumaran Vilai is a village in Kanyakumari district, Tamil Nadu, India. It is situated about two kilometers from Nagercoil.

== Climate ==
The maximum temperature during the summer hovers around 100 °F or 34 °C with moderate humidity at times. Kanyakumari district is the only Indian district to receive both the north-east monsoon and the south-west monsoon. It rains more often in Kanyakumari district than in any other part of Tamil Nadu, with the exception of the Nilgiris. Due to geographical conditions, the southern tip of Kanyakumari is generally 3 °C to 4 °C hotter than Nagercoil during the daytime, though Kanyakumari is only 20 km away.

== Schools in Vallankumaranvilai ==
- Govt. Higher Secondary School
- Govt. Primary School
- Vivekananda Kendra
- Kumaran Nursery School

== Places of worship ==
- Sri Vanna Ganeshar Temple
- Devi Sri Mutharamman Temple
- Sri Kannan Temple
- Sri Siva Sudalai Andavar Temple
