= Rotary Wing Society of India =

The Rotary Wing Society of India is a non-profit professional society that was founded on 18 June 1998 to aid the growth of the helicopter industry in India. RWSI has approximately 81 corporate members and 550 aviation professionals from the Indian civil and military aviation and has chapters in Delhi, Mumbai and Bangalore, India.

== Society Activities ==
- Hosts periodic interactive sessions with its members to find solutions to common issues affecting the industry.
- Provides consultancy services (on a not for profit basis) to the Indian industry.
- Conducts seminars, training and conferences on subjects related to the helicopter industry.
