= Satellite Launch Vehicle =

First launch vehicle of the Indian Space Research Organisation

- Satellite Launch Vehicle
- Function: Small-lift launch vehicle
- Manufacturer: ISRO
- Country of origin: India

Size
- Height: 22 m (72 ft)
- Diameter: 1 m (3.3 ft)
- Mass: 17,000 kg (37,000 lb)

Capacity

Payload to LEO
- Altitude: 400 km (250 mi)
- Mass: 41.5 kg (91 lb)

Associated rockets
- Derivative work: ASLV, PSLV

Launch history
- Status: Retired
- Launch sites: Satish Dhawan Space Centre
- Total launches: 4
- Success(es): 2
- Failure: 1
- Partial failure: 1
- First flight: 10 August 1979
- Last flight: 17 April 1983
- Carries passengers or cargo: Rohini

First stage
- Propellant mass: 8.6 t (19,000 lb)
- Powered by: 1 solid
- Maximum thrust: 450 kN (100,000 lbf)
- Specific impulse: 253 seconds (2.48 km/s)
- Burn time: 72 seconds (Altitude of 32 KM)
- Propellant: PBAN (Polybutadiene acrylonitrile) Solid

Second stage
- Propellant mass: 3 tonnes
- Powered by: 1 solid
- Maximum thrust: 20 tonnes
- Specific impulse: 267 sec
- Burn time: 40 seconds
- Propellant: PBAN (Polybutadine Acrylo Nitrate) Solid

Third stage
- Propellant mass: 1 tonnes
- Powered by: 1 solid
- Maximum thrust: 6.3 tonnes
- Specific impulse: 277 sec
- Burn time: 45 seconds
- Propellant: High energy propellant (HEF 20) Solid

Fourth stage
- Propellant mass: 262 kg
- Powered by: 1 solid
- Maximum thrust: 2.4 tonnes
- Specific impulse: 283 sec
- Burn time: 33 seconds
- Propellant: High energy propellant (HEF 20) Solid

The Satellite Launch Vehicle or SLV was a small-lift launch vehicle project started in the early 1970s by ISRO to develop the technology needed to launch satellites. SLV was intended to reach a height of 400 kilometres (250 mi) and carry a payload of 40 kg (88 lb). It was a four-stage rocket with all solid-propellant motors.

== History ==
The SLV-3 project was the first Indian Satellite launch vehicle project to develop a rocket capable of launching an 40 kilogram Rohini satellite into low-earth orbit from India. The project was set up in early 1972 by Vikram Sarabhai for an inaugural launch in 1977. The project was led by Dr. A.P.J Abdul Kalam as the project director, along with other prominent Indian engineers such as Dr. S. Srinivasan, Ved Prakash Sandlas, D. Narayanamoorthi, G. Madhavan Nair, M.S.R. Dev, M.K. Abdul Majeed, D. Sasikumar, P.S. Veeraraghavan and A. Sivathanu Pillai. India would develop and launch its first satellite, Aryabhatta on a Soviet Kosmos-3M rocket in 1975. The rocket represented the culmination of seven years of developmental efforts of ISRO. The rocket was designed with 44 major systems and 250 sub-systems and was mostly built in Thumba. Much of the control systems were developed on the indigenous Iris 55 computers. The total development cost for the SLV-3 programme by 1980 was ₹20 crore (equivalent to ₹505 crore or US$52 million in 2026). Some components (up to 15% of the original design) had been developed from a joint project with CNES for the upper stage development, which was partially inspired from the Diamant rocket.

The SLV-3 was primarily developed from technology built for the smaller Rohini sounding rockets which had been used by ISRO previously. The SLV-3 was unique in the fact that it was not derived from an pre-existing Ballistic missile, as the early rockets of most nations were. The First stage of the SLV-3 rocket would eventually be used on the larger and succeeding PSLV rocket as a booster stage. The stage would also be repurposed for the India's strategic Agni ballistic missile family.

It took approximately seven years to realise the vehicle from start. The solid motor case for first and second stage were fabricated from 15 CDV6 steel sheets and third and fourth stages from fibre reinforced plastic. The aerodynamic characterization research was conducted at the National Aerospace Laboratories' 1.2m Trisonic Wind Tunnel Facility. Small liquid engine thrusters were also developed by ISRO for SLV-3 and the resulting subsystem, called the Secondary Injection Thrust Vector Control system would also be used on the ASLV and PSLV.

The first launch of the SLV took place in Sriharikota on 10 August 1979. The fourth and final launch of the SLV took place on 17 April 1983.

The United States would later accuse India that the SLV-3 rocket was a copied derivative of the Scout rocket, and the Agni-I missile (with SLV-3 design heritage) combined it with a liquid fuelled stage from the SA-2 missile. The US would also claim German, French and Russian compliancy for the rocket, with the Germans supplying most major technologies and the testing wind-tunnel models. The Indian scientists have opposed it, stating that the rocket was built for peaceful exploration purposes. Notably, while the rocket shared some superficial design similarities, they used different propellants, and the SLV-3 incorporated a higher Length/Diameter ratio, had different thrust rates and burn times. Unlike the early Scout rockets, the SLV-3 incorporated a larger payload fairing, although they could not launch as much payload to orbit.

== Launch history ==
All four SLV launches occurred from the SLV Launch Pad at the Sriharikota High Altitude Range. The first two launches were experimental (E) and the next 2 were designated as developmental (D) as this was the first launch vehicle being developed by India and was not intended for a long service life. The first experimental flight of SLV, in August 1979, was a failure. The first successful launch took place on 18 July 1980.

Flight No.	Date / time (UTC)	Rocket, Configuration	Launch site	Payload	Payload mass	Orbit	User	Launch outcome
E1	10 August 1979	Satellite Launch Vehicle	SLV Launch Pad	Rohini Technology Payload	35 kg	Low Earth	ISRO	Failure
E1	Faulty valve caused vehicle to crash into the Bay of Bengal 317 seconds after launch.							
E2	18 July 1980	Satellite Launch Vehicle	SLV Launch Pad	Rohini RS-1	35 kg	Low Earth	ISRO	Success
E2	It was the first satellite successfully launched by the indigenous launch vehicle SLV. It provided data on the fourth stage of SLV.							
D1	31 May 1981	Satellite Launch Vehicle	SLV Launch Pad	Rohini RS-D1	38 kg	Low Earth	ISRO	Partial failure
D1	Orbit too low. Decayed after nine days							
D2	17 April 1983	Satellite Launch Vehicle	SLV Launch Pad	Rohini RS-D2	41.5 kg	Low Earth	ISRO	Success
D2	Earth Observation satellite. The launch was witnessed by then Prime Minister of India Indira Gandhi.							

== Launch statistics ==
- Failure
- Partial failure
- Success

Decade-wise summary of SLV launches

Decade	Successful	Partial success	Failure	Total
1970s	0	0	1	1
1980s	2	1	0	3
Total	2	1	1	4

== See also ==
- Launch vehicles of ISRO
- Comparison of orbital launchers families
- Timeline of artificial satellites and space probes
- Scout Rocket
- Kosmos-3M
