= ISRO Inertial Systems Unit =

India's national space agency

- Indian Space Research Organisation Logo

Agency overview
- Abbreviation: IISU
- Formed: 15 August 1969; 56 years ago
- Type: Space agency
- Jurisdiction: Government of India
- Headquarters: Thiruvananthapuram; 8°32′07″N 76°59′35″E
- Leader: Shri. Sowmia Narayanan
- Owner: Vikram Sarabhai Space Centre
- Website: www.isro.gov.in/IISU.html

The ISRO Inertial Systems Unit (IISU), is a research and development unit of ISRO located in Vattiyoorkavu, Thiruvananthapuram that specialises in inertial sensors and systems in satellite technology. IISU specialized fields include the fields of launch vehicle inertial systems, spacecraft inertial systems, inertial sensors evaluation and simulation, inertial system production, inertial systems electronic production, reliability and quality assurance and advanced inertial systems group.
