= ISRO facilities =

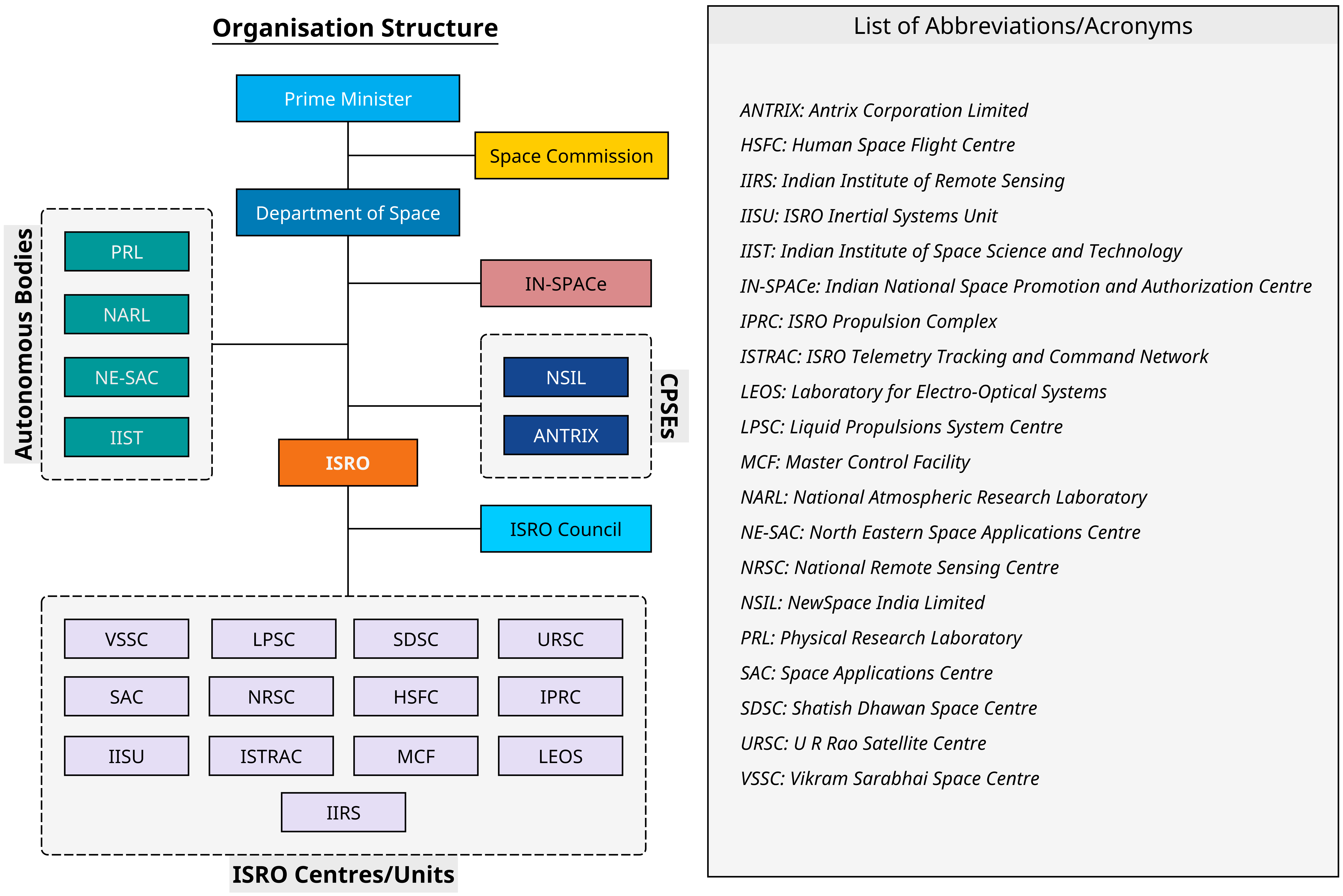
The organisational structure of the Indian Department of Space

There are several ISRO facilities all over India. ISRO headquarters in Bengaluru provides overall direction for the organisation. There are more than twenty facilities which support ISRO.

ISRO has lots of different technical centres and facilities, which supports and enable it to work smoothly on a day to day basis. Such facilities are listed below under different sections.

== Research facilities ==
=== Vikram sarabhai space centre ===
The largest ISRO base which is located in Thiruvananthapuram, is also the main technical centre and the venue for development of the SLV-3, ASLV, and PSLV series. The base supports TERLS and the Rohini Sounding Rocket programme. It is also developing the GSLV series.

=== Liquid propulsion systems centre ===
The LPSC which is located in both Thiruvananthapuram and Bengaluru, handles design, development, testing and implementation of liquid propulsion control packages, liquid stages and liquid engines for launch vehicles and satellites. The testing of these systems is largely conducted at IPRC at Mahendragiri. The LPSC, Bengaluru also produces precision transducers.

=== Physical research laboratory ===
PRL which is located in Ahmedabad, conducts research in Solar planetary physics, Infrared astronomy, Geo-cosmo physics, Plasma physics, astrophysics, archaeology, and hydrology. It also operates the observatory at Udaipur.

=== National atmospheric research Laboratory ===
The NARL located in Tirupati, carries out fundamental and applied research in atmospheric and space sciences.

=== Space applications centre ===
The SAC located in Ahmedabad, deals with the various aspects of the practical use of space technology. Among the fields of research at the SAC are geodesy, satellite based telecommunications, surveying, remote sensing, meteorology, environment monitoring etc. The SAC also operates the Delhi Earth Station, which is located in Delhi and is used for demonstration of various SATCOM experiments in addition to normal SATCOM operations.

=== North-eastern space applications centre ===
This facility located in Meghalaya, provides developmental support to North East by undertaking specific application projects using remote sensing, GIS, Satellite Communication and conducting space science research.

== Test facilities ==
=== ISRO propulsion complex ===
The facility which is located in Mahendragiri was formerly called LPSC-Mahendragiri and was declared a separate centre. It handles testing and assembly of liquid propulsion control packages, liquid engines, and stages for launch vehicles and satellites.

== Construction and launch facilities ==
=== U. R. Rao Satellite Centre ===
The venue of eight successful spacecraft projects located in Bengaluru, is also one of the main satellite technology bases of ISRO. The facility serves as a venue for implementing indigenous spacecraft in India. The satellites Aryabhata, Bhaskara, APPLE, and IRS-1A were built at this site, and the IRS and INSAT satellite series are presently under development here. This centre was formerly known as ISRO Satellite Centre.

=== Laboratory for Electro-Optics Systems ===
This is the Unit of ISRO which responsible for the development of altitude sensors for all satellites and is located in Bengaluru. The high precision optics for all cameras and payloads in all ISRO satellites are developed at this laboratory, located at Peenya Industrial Estate, Bengaluru.

=== Satish Dhawan Space Centre ===
With multiple sub-sites the Sriharikota island facility acts as a launching site for India's satellites. The Sriharikota facility is also the main launch base for India's sounding rockets. The centre is also home to India's largest Solid Propellant Space Booster Plant (SPROB) and houses the Static Test and Evaluation Complex (STEX). The Second Vehicle Assembly Building (SVAB) at Sriharikota is being realised as an additional integration facility, with suitable interfacing to a second launch pad.

=== SSLV Launch Complex ===
SLC is an under construction spaceport of ISRO, located in Kulasekarapattinam, a coastal village in Thoothukudi district of Tamil Nadu. After completion, it will be the second launch facility of ISRO which will cater smaller rockets such as the SSLV and private sector's launch vehicles.

=== Thumba Equatorial Rocket Launching Station ===
TERLS which is located in Thiruvananthapuram, is used to launch sounding rockets.

== Tracking and control facilities ==
=== Indian deep space network ===
IDSN network which is located in Bengaluru, receives, processes, archives and distributes the spacecraft health data and payload data in real-time. It can track and monitor satellites up to very large distances, even beyond the Moon.

=== National remote sensing centre ===
The NRSC which is headquartered in Hyderabad, applies remote sensing to manage natural resources and study aerial surveying. With centres at Balanagar and Shadnagar it also has training facilities at Dehradun acting as the Indian Institute of Remote Sensing.

=== ISRO telemetry, tracking and command network ===
This facility's headquarters is located in Bengaluru and it also has a number of ground stations throughout India and the world. Software development, Ground Operations, Tracking Telemetry and Command (TTC), and support is provided by this institution. ISTRAC has Tracking stations throughout the country and all over the world in Port Louis (Mauritius), Bearslake (Russia), Biak (Indonesia) and Brunei.

=== Master control facility ===
MCF which is located in both Hassan and Bhopal, is mainly used for geostationary satellite orbit raising, payload testing, and in-orbit operations are performed at this facility. The MCF has Earth stations and the Satellite Control Centre (SCC) for controlling satellites. A second MCF-like facility named 'MCF-B' is being constructed at Bhopal.

=== Space situational awareness control centre ===
This facility which is located in Peenya and Bengaluru, has a network of telescopes and radars are being set up under the Directorate of Space Situational Awareness and Management to monitor space debris and to safeguard space-based assets. The new facility will end ISRO's dependence on NORAD. The sophisticated multi-object tracking radar installed in Nellore, a radar in Northeast India and telescopes in Thiruvananthapuram, Mount Abu and North India will be part of this network.

=== Directorate of space situational awareness and management ===
To reduce dependency on North America Aerospace Defense Command (NORAD) for space situational awareness and protect the civilian and military assets, ISRO is setting up telescopes and radars in four locations to cover each direction. Leh, Mount Abu and Ponmudi were selected to station the telescopes and radars that will cover North, West and South of Indian territory. The last one will be in Northeast India to cover the entire eastern region. Satish Dhawan Space Centre at Sriharikota already supports Multi-Object Tracking Radar (MOTR). All the telescopes and radars will come under Directorate of Space Situational Awareness and Management (DSSAM) in Bengaluru. It will collect tracking data on inactive satellites and will also perform research on active debris removal, space debris modelling and mitigation.

For early warning, ISRO began a ₹400 crore (4 billion; US$53 million) project called Network for Space Object Tracking and Analysis (NETRA). It will help the country track atmospheric entry, intercontinental ballistic missile (ICBM), anti-satellite weapon and other space-based attacks. All the radars and telescopes will be connected through NETRA. The system will support remote and scheduled operations. NETRA will follow the Inter-Agency Space Debris Coordination Committee (IASDCC) and United Nations Office for Outer Space Affairs (UNOSA) guidelines. The objective of NETRA is to track objects at a distance of 36,000 kilometres (22,000 mi) in GTO.

India signed a memorandum of understanding on the Space Situational Awareness Data Sharing Pact with the US in April 2022. It will enable Department of Space to collaborate with the Combined Space Operation Center (CSpOC) to protect the space-based assets of both nations from natural and human-made threats. On 11 July 2022, ISRO System for Safe and Sustainable Space Operations Management (IS4OM) at Space Situational Awareness Control Centre, in Peenya was inaugurated by Jitender Singh. It will help provide information on on-orbit collision, fragmentation, atmospheric re-entry risk, space-based strategic information, hazardous asteroids, and space weather forecast. IS4OM will safeguard all the operational space assets, identify and monitor other operational spacecraft with close approaches which have overpasses over Indian subcontinent and those which conduct intentional manoeuvres with suspicious motives or seek re-entry within South Asia.

=== ISRO system for safe and sustainable space operations management ===
On 7 March 2023, IS4OM conducted successful controlled re-entry of decommissioned satellite Megha-Tropiques after firing four on-board 11 Newton thrusters for 20 minutes each. A series of 20 manoeuvres were performed since August 2022 by spending 120 kg fuel. The final telemetry data confirmed disintegtration over Pacific Ocean. It was part of a compliance effort following international guidelines on space debris mitigation.

== Human resource development ==
=== Indian institute of remote sensing ===
The Indian Institute of Remote Sensing (IIRS) which is located in Dehradun, is a premier training and educational institute set up for developing trained professionals (P.G. and PhD level) in the field of remote sensing, geoinformatics and GPS technology for natural resources, environmental and disaster management. IIRS is also executing many R&D projects on remote sensing and GIS for societal applications. IIRS also runs various outreach programmes (Live & Interactive and e-learning) to build trained skilled human resources in the field of remote sensing and geospatial technologies.

=== Indian institute of space science and technology ===
The institute which is located in Thiruvananthapuram, offers undergraduate and graduate courses in Aerospace Engineering, Electronics and Communication Engineering (Avionics), and Engineering Physics. The students of the first three batches of IIST were inducted into different ISRO centres.

=== Development and educational communication unit ===
The centre located in Ahmedabad, works for education, research, and training, mainly in conjunction with the INSAT programme. The main activities carried out at DECU include GRAMSAT and EDUSAT projects. The Training and Development Communication Channel (TDCC) also falls under the operational control of the DECU.

=== Space technology incubation centres ===
The S-TICs opened at premier technical universities in India to promote startups to build applications and products in tandem with the industry and would be used for future space missions. The S-TIC will bring the industry, academia and ISRO under one umbrella to contribute towards research and development (R&D) initiatives relevant to the Indian Space Programme.

These Centers are located at the following Places:

- Dr. B. R. Ambedkar National Institute of Technology Jalandhar
- Maulana Azad National Institute of Technology
- National Institute of Technology Agartala
- National Institute of Technology, Rourkela
- Visvesvaraya National Institute of Technology
- National Institute of Technology, Tiruchirappalli

=== Space innovation centre ===
In line with its ongoing effort to promote R&D in space technology through industry as well as academia, ISRO in collaboration with Veer Surendra Sai University of Technology (VSSUT), Burla, Sambalpur, Odisha, has set up Veer Surendra Sai Space Innovation Centre (VSSSIC) within its campus at Sambalpur. The objective of its Space Innovation Research Lab is to promote and encourage the students in research and development in the area of space science and technology at VSSUT and other institutes within this region.

Space Innovation Centres are located in the following Places:

- Veer Surendra Sai University of Technology at Burla, Sambalpur

Regional academy centre for space

All these centres are set up in tier-2 cities to create awareness, strengthen academic collaboration and act as incubators for space technology, space science and space applications. The activities of RAC-S will maximise the use of research potential, infrastructure, expertise, experience and facilitate capacity building.

Regional Academy centre for Space are located in the following places:

- Gauhati University
- National Institute of Technology Kurukshetra
- Malaviya National Institute of Technology
- National Institute of Technology Karnataka
- National Institute of Technology Patna
- Indian Institute of Technology (BHU) Varanasi

=== Advance space research group ===
Like NASA funded Jet Propulsion Laboratory (JPL) managed by California Institute of Technology (Caltech), ISRO with Indian Institute of Space Science and Technology (IIST) implemented a joint working framework in 2021 in which an Empowered Overseeing Committee (EOC) under Capacity Building Programme Office (CBPO) of ISRO located in Bengaluru will approve all short, medium and long term space research projects of common interest. In return, an Advance Space Research Group (ASRG) formed at IIST under the guidance of EOC will have full access to ISRO facilities. The primary aim is to transform IIST into a premier space research and engineering institute by 2028–2030 that can lead future space exploration missions of ISRO.

== Commercial and marketing facilities ==
These facilities come under the administrative control of Department of Space (DoS) and are used to promote and market ISRO's products and services.

=== Antrix Corporation Limited (Commercial Wing) ===
Set up as the marketing arm of ISRO, Antrix's job is to promote products, services and technology developed by ISRO.

=== NewSpace India Limited (Commercial Wing) ===
Set up for marketing spin-off technologies, tech transfers through industry interface and scale up industry participation in the space programmes.

=== Space Technology Incubation Centre ===
ISRO has opened Space Technology Incubation Centres (S-TIC) at premier technical universities in India which will incubate startups to build applications and products in tandem with the industry and for use in future space missions. The S-TIC will bring the industry, academia and ISRO under one umbrella to contribute towards research and development (R&D) initiatives relevant to the Indian Space Programme. S-TICs are at the National Institute of Technology, Agartala serving for east region, National Institute of Technology, Jalandhar for the north region, and the National Institute of Technology, Tiruchirappalli for the south region of India.

=== Advanced Space Research Group ===
Similar to NASA's California Institute of Technology-operated Jet Propulsion Laboratory, ISRO and the Indian Institute of Space Science and Technology (IIST) implemented a joint working framework in 2021, wherein ISRO will approve all short-, medium- and long-term space research projects of common interest between the two. In return, an Advanced Space Research Group (ASRG) formed at IIST under the guidance of the EOC will have full access to ISRO facilities. This was done with the aim of "transforming" the IIST into a premier space research and engineering institute with the capability of leading future space exploration missions for ISRO.

=== Directorate of Space Situational Awareness and Management ===
To reduce dependency on North American Aerospace Defense Command (NORAD) for space situational awareness and protect the civilian and military assets, ISRO is setting up telescopes and radars in four locations to cover each direction. Leh, Mount Abu and Ponmudi were selected to station the telescopes and radars that will cover North, West and South of Indian territory. The last one will be in Northeast India to cover the entire eastern region. Satish Dhawan Space Centre at Sriharikota already supports Multi-Object Tracking Radar (MOTR). All the telescopes and radars will come under Directorate of Space Situational Awareness and Management (DSSAM) in Bengaluru. It will collect tracking data on inactive satellites and will also perform research on active debris removal, space debris modelling and mitigation.

For early warning, ISRO began a ₹400 crore (4 billion; US$53 million) project called Network for Space Object Tracking and Analysis (NETRA). It will help the country track atmospheric entry, intercontinental ballistic missile (ICBM), anti-satellite weapon and other space-based attacks. All the radars and telescopes will be connected through NETRA. The system will support remote and scheduled operations. NETRA will follow the Inter-Agency Space Debris Coordination Committee (IASDCC) and United Nations Office for Outer Space Affairs (UNOSA) guidelines. The objective of NETRA is to track objects at a distance of 36,000 kilometres (22,000 mi) in GTO.

India signed a memorandum of understanding on the Space Situational Awareness Data Sharing Pact with the US in April 2022. It will enable DoS to collaborate with the Combined Space Operation Center (CSpOC) to protect the space-based assets of both nations from natural and man-made threats. On 11 July 2022, ISRO System for Safe and Sustainable Space Operations Management (IS4OM) at Space Situational Awareness Control Centre, in Peenya was inaugurated by Jitendra Singh. It will help provide information on on-orbit collision, fragmentation, atmospheric re-entry risk, space-based strategic information, hazardous asteroids, and space weather forecast. IS4OM will safeguard all the operational space assets, identify and monitor other operational spacecraft with close approaches which have overpasses over Indian subcontinent and those which conduct intentional manoeuvres with suspicious motives or seek re-entry within South Asia.

==== ISRO System for Safe and Sustainable Space Operations Management ====
On 7 March 2023, ISRO System for Safe and Sustainable Space Operations Management (IS4OM) conducted successful controlled re-entry of decommissioned satellite Megha-Tropiques after firing four on-board 11 Newton thrusters for 20 minutes each. A series of 20 manoeuvres were performed since August 2022 by spending 120 kg fuel. The final telemetry data confirmed disintegration over Pacific Ocean. It was part of a compliance effort following international guidelines on space debris mitigation.

Speaking at the 42nd annual meeting of the Inter-Agency Space Debris Coordination Committee (IADC) in Bengaluru, S. Somanath stated that the long-term goal is for all Indian space actors—both governmental and non-governmental—to accomplish debris-free space missions by 2030.

=== Other facilities ===
- Balasore Rocket Launching Station (BRLS) – Balasore
- Bhaskaracharya Institute For Space Applications and Geo-Informatics (BISAG), Gandhinagar
- Human Space Flight Centre (HSFC), Bengaluru
- Indian Regional Navigation Satellite System (IRNSS)
- Indian Space Science Data Centre (ISSDC)
- Integrated Space Cell
- Inter-University Centre for Astronomy and Astrophysics (IUCAA)
- ISRO Inertial Systems Unit (IISU) – Thiruvananthapuram
- Master Control Facility
- National Deep Space Observation Centre (NDSPO)
- Regional Remote Sensing Service Centres (RRSSC)

== See also ==
- NASA facilities

== Sources ==
- Ojha, N.N. "India in Space". Science & Technology. New Delhi: Chronicle Books. pp. 110–143.
- Suri, R.K.; Rajaram, Kalpana. "Space Research". Science and Technology in India. New Delhi: Spectrum. pp. 411–448. ISBN 81-7930-294-6.
