= Young Scientist Programme =

Indian space education programme

Young Scientist Programme (YUva VIgyani KAryakram in Hindi) (YUVIKA)
- Motto: Imparting Basic Knowledge of Space Technologies in Youngsters
- Founder: ISRO
- Country: India
- Launched: 13 May 2019; 6 years ago
- Funding: ISRO
- Status: Yuvika'24 Announced.
- Website: https://www.isro.gov.in/YUVIKA.html

Young Scientist Programme, otherwise known as YUVIKA (abbreviation for "YUva VIgyani KAryakram") in an annual space education and training programme by ISRO with funding from Department of Space, India. The programme was initiated by government of India "to create an early interest in Space Technologies among youngsters". The program was officially announced on January 18, 2019, by ISRO's chief K. Sivan and inaugurated four months later on May 17.

== Overview ==
The programme was announced by ISRO chief K. Sivan on January 18, 2019, through Student Outreach Programme held by Indian Space Research Organization. In the announcement, Sivan urged the state governments and respective education departments to actively cooperate to make the programme a success.

== History ==
ISRO chief, during the announcement said that "the programme was aimed to inculcate and nurture space research interest in young minds." Their selection basis based on "academic performance and extracurricular activities", Sivan also added "students from rural backgrounds would be given preference in selection criteria".

The programme also includes invited talks by scientists, along with scheduled lab and facilities visits in the country. Apart from these, ISRO also said that there will be sessions for discussions with experts in Space Technologies. ISRO is also determined to organize practical and feedback sessions for the students.

== YUVIKA'19 ==
The programme commenced on May 13, 2019, for the first time, as a two-week residential training programme held each summer holidays. The participation in programme was meant only for students getting in high school in the academic year 2019–2020.

The shortlisted students attended the 2 weeks training programme at four centers of ISRO namely, Vikram Sarabhai Space Centre (VSSC), Thiruvananthapuram; U R Rao Satellite Centre (URSC), Bengaluru; Space Applications Centre (SAC), Ahmedabad and North Eastern Space Applications Centre (NESAC), Shillong.

The programme concluded on May 25, 2019, at the respective centers. The participants of YUVIKA'19 also witnessed the launch of 'RH200 sounding rocket'.

== YUVIKA'20 & 2021 ==
YUVIKA'20 was to be held in May 2020, but was postponed and later cancelled in light of ongoing COVID-19 Pandemic in India . YUVIKA'21 was also cancelled due to ongoing coronavirus pandemic.

== YUVIKA'22 ==
YUVIKA'22 was the first post COVID YUVIKA with a record 100k application from all over the country. A total of 153 among those who applied were selected in the program based on academic and co-curricular activities. The event was inaugurated in a virtual event by the secretary, ISO DOS/Chairman on 16 May 2022. The program concluded on May 28, 2022.

== YUVIKA'23 ==
YUVIKA'23 received a record 125k applications from all over the country from which a total of 337 students were shortlisted for the program. The program commenced on May 15, 2023, and ran for two weeks concluding on May 26, 2023.

== YUVIKA'24 ==
YUVIKA'24 was announced by ISRO in a press release on February 17, 2024. A total of 350 students from all 28 Indian states and 8 union territories participated in the program across seven ISRO centers.

== YUVIKA'25 ==
YUVIKA'25 has been conducted successfully by ISRO.

== Details ==
The programme is conducted every year at seven centers of ISRO.

–Indian Institute of Remote Sensing (IIRS), Dehradun.

–Vikram Sarabhai Space Centre (VSSC), Thiruvananthapuram.

–Satish Dhavan Space Center (SDSC) Sriharikota.

–U. R. Rao Satellite Centre (URSC), Bengaluru.

–Space Applications Centre (SAC), Ahmedabad.

–National Remote Sensing Centre (NRSC), Hyderabad.

–North-Eastern Space Applications Centre (NE-SAC), Shillong.
