= Koppillil Radhakrishnan =

Chairman of the Indian Space Research Organisation

K. Radhakrishnan
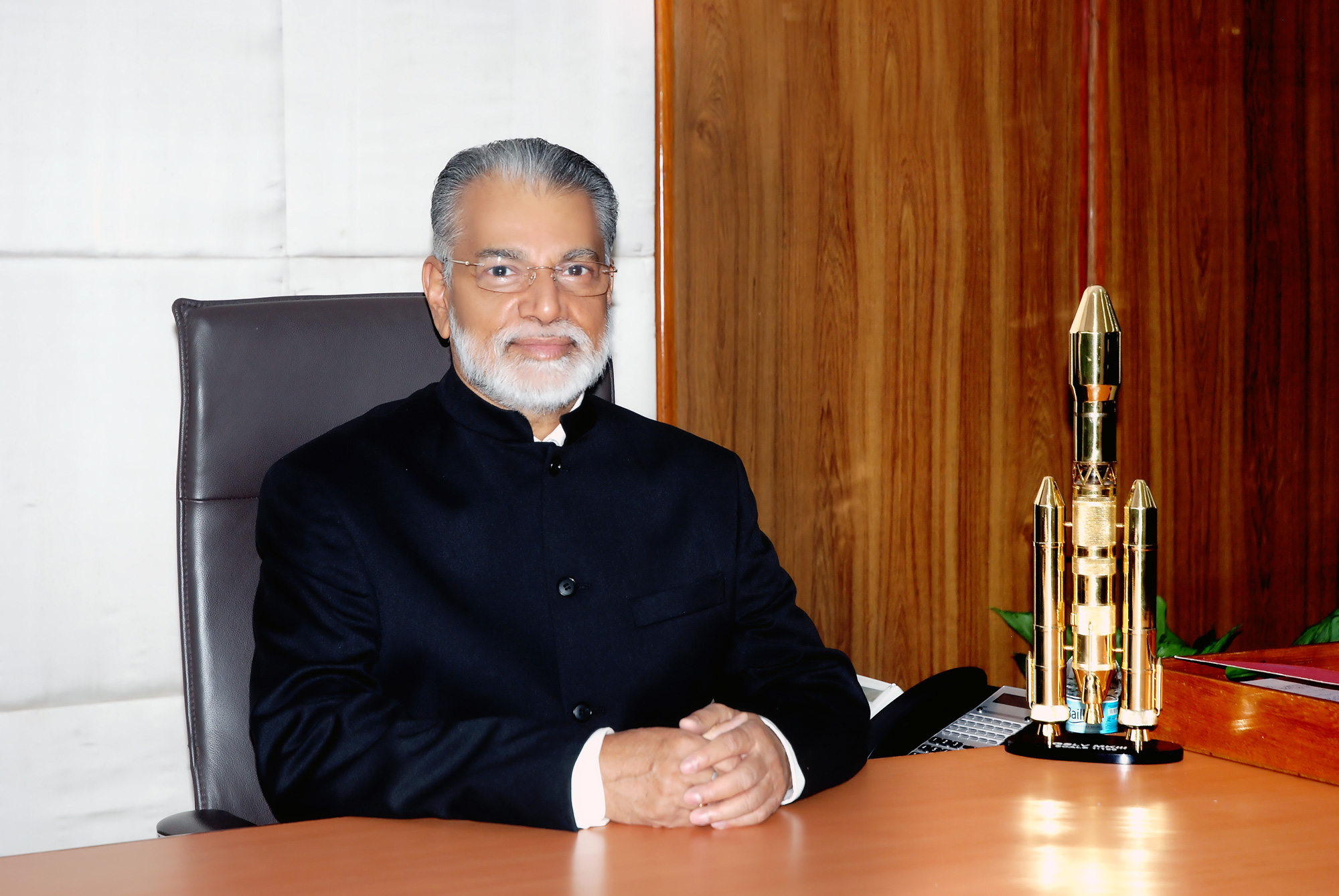
- Radhakrishnan in 2014

7th Chairman of ISRO
- In office 30 October 2009 – 31 December 2014
- Preceded by: G. Madhavan Nair
- Succeeded by: Shailesh Nayak
- Prime Minister: Manmohan Singh; Narendra Modi

Personal details
- Born: 29 August 1949 (age 77) Irinjalakuda, United State of Travancore and Cochin, Dominion of India (present day Thrissur, Keralam, India)
- Scientific career
- Education: Government Engineering College, Thrissur (BE); IIM Bangalore (MBA); IIT Kharagpur (PhD)
- Known for: Chandrayaan-1, Mangalyaan
- Awards: Padma Bhushan (2014)
- Fields: Electrical Engineering; Space research
- Workplaces: Vikram Sarabhai Space Centre; National Remote Sensing Agency; Indian National Centre for Ocean Information Services; Indian Space Research Organisation; Indian Institute of Technology Kanpur

Koppillil Radhakrishnan (born 29 August 1949) is an Indian space scientist who headed ISRO as Chairman of Space Commission, Secretary of the Department of Space, Government of India. Under his leadership, India became the first country to reach Mars in its first attempt.

== Education and personal life ==
Koppillil Radhakrishnan hails from Irinjalakuda in Thrissur district, Kerala from a Malayali Nair family. After his schooling at the National High School, Irinjalakuda, he did two-year Pre-degree studies (Mathematics, Physics, Chemistry) at Christ College, Irinjalakuda. He studied Electrical Engineering at the Government Engineering College, Thrissur and acquired BSc (Engg.) degree in First Class with Honours from Kerala University in 1970. He did post-graduate studies in management at Indian Institute of Management Bangalore in 1974–76. He obtained doctorate from the Indian Institute of Technology Kharagpur, in 2000, for the thesis: 'Some Strategies for the Management of Indian Earth Observation System'.

Radhakrishnan married Padmini Kizhakke Valappil from Irinjalakuda in 1983. Padmini worked with State Bank of Travancore from 1980 to 2010.

== Indian Space Research Organisation ==
Radhakrishnan joined ISRO in May 1971 at the Space Science & Technology Centre at Thiruvananthapuram (the present Vikram Sarabhai Space Centre) as a design and development engineer of electro-mechanical devices. Later he worked on system planning and technology management for avionics systems of SLV-3, ASLV and PSLV. During 1981–97, at the ISRO Headquarters, he oversaw the preparation and review of annual budgets of ISRO, formulation of decade profile and Five Year Plans for Indian Space programme and the related techno-economic analysis.

=== Remote Sensing Applications. ===
As Project Director, he set up a chain of regional remote sensing service centres (RRSSC) at Bangalore, Nagpur, Kharagpur, Jodhpur and Dehradun for capacity building in central and state government agencies. While he was the director, RRSSCs came to prominence in the national remote sensing application missions including the Integrated Mission for Sustainable Development (IMSD) aimed at generation of spatial database of natural resources and action plans for sustainable development of land and water resources.

Later, Radhakrishnan succeeded as the mission director of IMSD and moved to National Remote Sensing Agency in Hyderabad. IMSD was considered as largest remote sensing application experiment ever done in the world using a meticulous participatory approach. As the director of National Remote Sensing Agency, he scripted India's modern multi-mission ground station for Earth Observation Satellites.

=== Space Transportation System and Chandrayaan-1 Mission ===
While at Vikram Sarabhai Space Centre as its director, he oversaw five successful launches of PSLV including development of its high-end version PSLV –XL that lofted Chandrayaan-1 in October 2008 as well as formulation of Indian Human Spaceflight programme.

=== Chief of India's Space Programme ===
As India's space chief from November 2009 to December 2014, Radhakrishnan led ISRO to achieve 37 space missions including several historic feats including Mars Orbiter Mission; flying Indian Cryogenic Engine on GSLV; the first experimental flight of the GSLV Mk III; a re-entry experiment of an uncrewed crew module; and new space capabilities through IRNSS (1A, 1B, 1C) for navigation; GSAT-7 for strategic communication; and RISAT-1 for microwave radar imaging. ISRO completed two joint satellite missions (Megha Tropiques and SARAL) with the French National Space Agency and inked another agreement with NASA to jointly build an advanced Radar Imaging Satellite. India's standing in the global space market was enhanced as PSLV launched 18 commercial satellites for 11 countries. Through an inclusive organisational process, Radhakrishnan charted out clear programmatic directions and nurtured younger generation of leaders for carrying forward the legacy of ISRO. Re-defining the Chandrayaan-2 mission with Indigenous lander and rover and extending the application of space technologies and tools to all central ministries are highlights of his leadership regime at ISRO. He worked to enhance the partnership with the Indian space industry for the production of operational launchers and satellites.

During his leadership, ISRO received the 2014 Gandhi Peace Prize; the 2014 Indira Gandhi Prize for Peace, Disarmament and Development; the 2014 Knowledge Economy Network KEN Award; the 2014 CNN-IBN Indian of the Year-Lifetime Achievement Award; the 2014 Global Game Changer Award by the Marico Innovation Foundation; and the 2013 CNBC-18 India Business Leader Award-BRAND INDIA.

==== Mars Orbiter Mission (Mangalyaan) ====
Mars Orbiter Mission (MOM; aka Mangalyaan) was conceived, planned and executed, within four years (2010–2014), establishing India as the first country to have successful mission to Mars in its maiden attempt, and at significantly low cost (INR 4.5 billion).

==== Geosynchronous Satellite Launch Vehicle and Indian Cryogenic Stage ====
GSLV had a checkered history in its initial flights of 2001-2007 and they were powered by cryogenic upper stage of Russia. After failure of the Indian Cryogenic upper stage on GSLV in April 2010 (GSLV-D3) and recurrence one more failure of GSLV with Russian Cryogeinc upper stage (GSLV-F06) in December 2010, Radhakrishnan steered ISRO towards the landmark success in January 2014 GSLV-D5. This marked the beginning of the successful series of GSLV with Indian Cryogenic Upper Stage.

== Ocean Observation and Information Services ==
Radhakrishnan had a stint of five years the Ministry of Earth Sciences to set up, Indian National Centre for Ocean Information Services (INCOIS). In the aftermath of the Indian Ocean Tsunami disaster of December 2004, he emerged as the Project Director to set up the Indian Ocean Tsunami Warning Centre.

== Kathakali and Carnatic Music ==
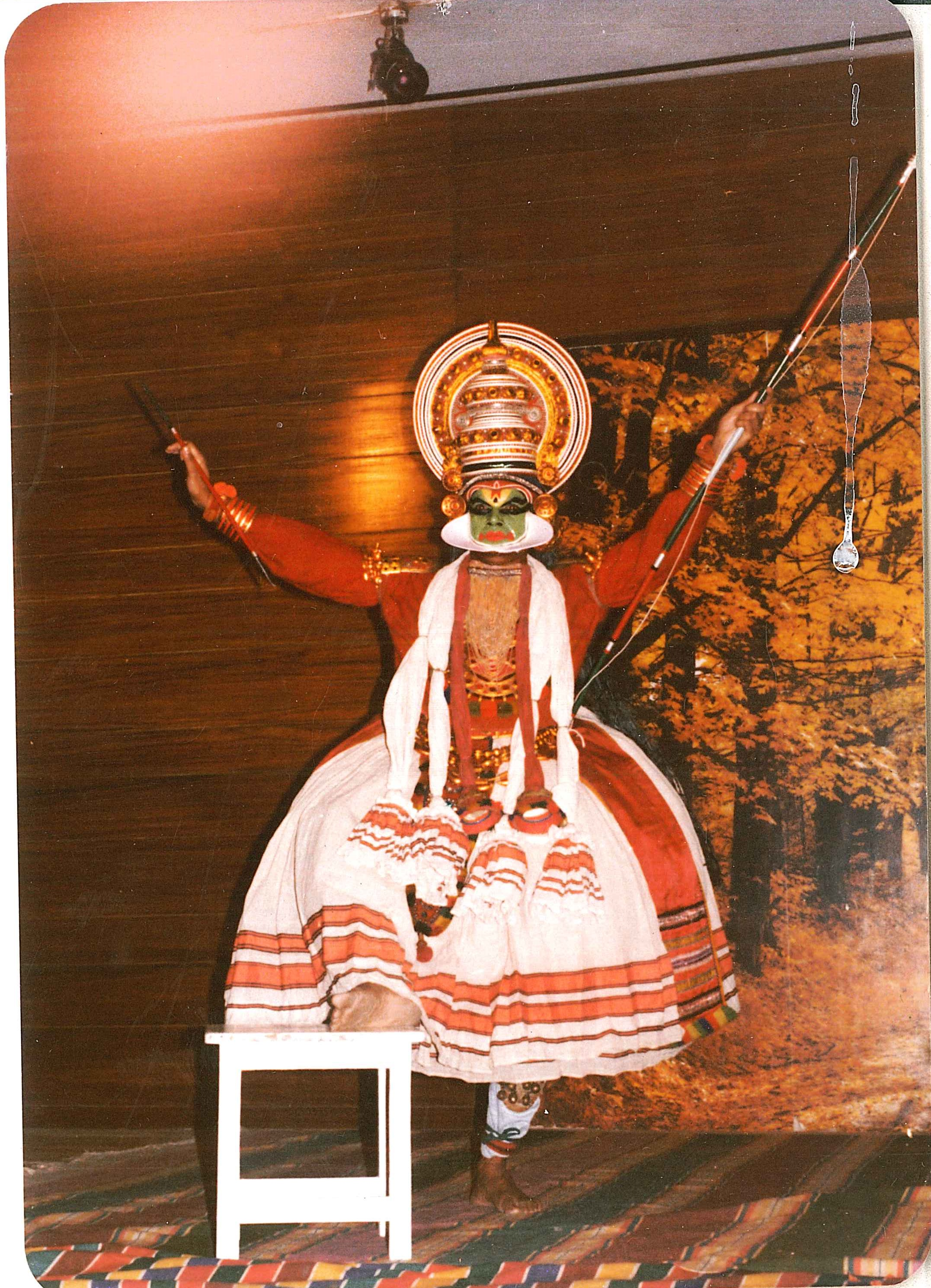
K. Radhakrishnan (1987) Enacting the role of King Daksha, who is annoyed at Siva for taking away his daughter Sati in marriage.

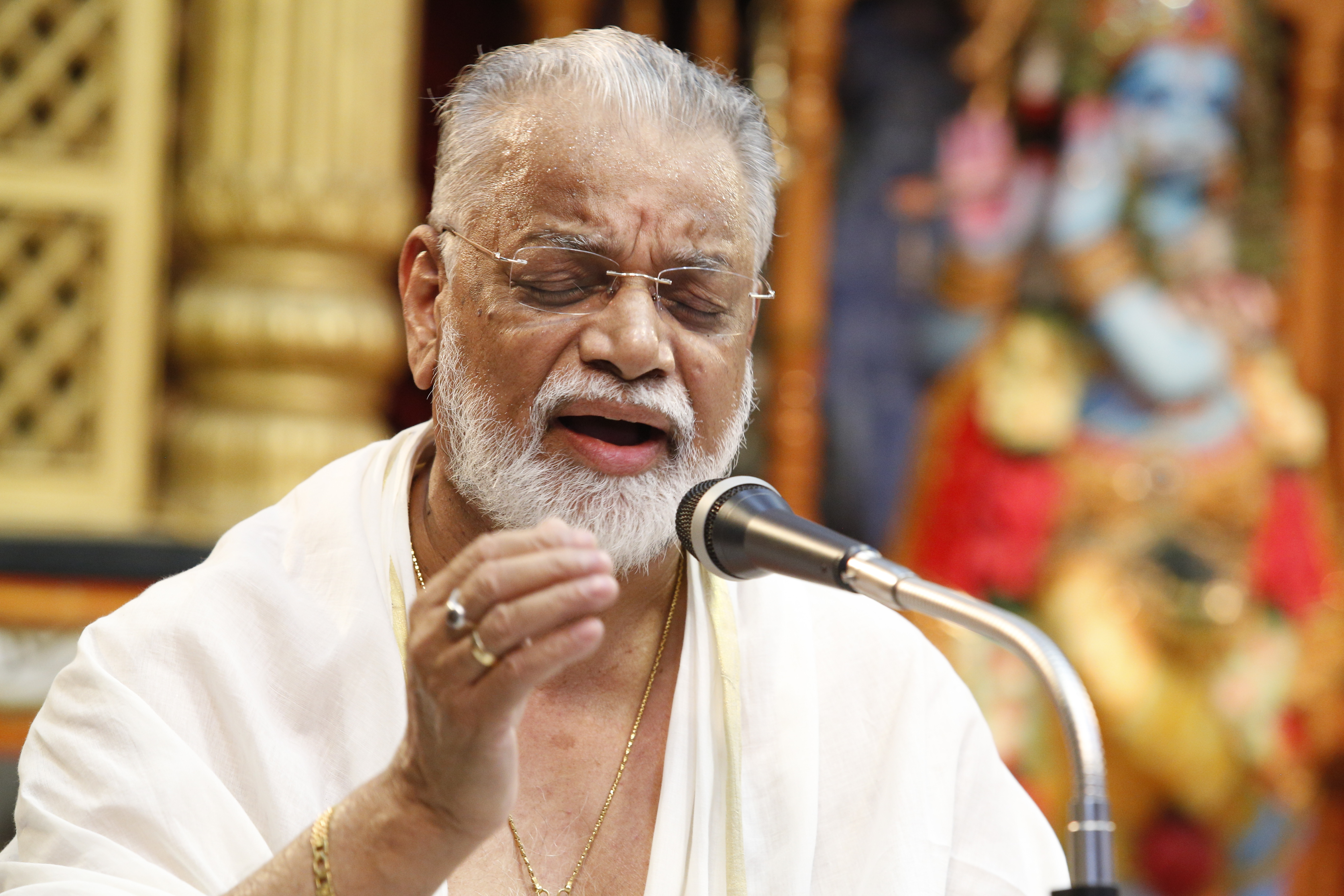
Radhakrishnan singing at Guruvayoor Chembai Sangetholsavam 2018

Radhakrishnan is a Carnatic music and Kathakali enthusiast and performer. Radhakrishnan was drawn into the world of performing arts from childhood. After formal training in Kerala Natanam, under Professor Thrippunithura Vijayabhanu, he had training in Kathakali dance under Guru Pallippuram Gopalan Nair, Kalanilayam Raghavan and Shri T.V.A Varier. Also, he was trained in Carnatic music by eminent musicians like Prof. Vechoor Harihara Subramania Iyer, Dr. R.K. Srikantan, Dr. Nookala Chinna Satyanarayana; currently he is student of Vidwan R.S. Ramakanth. Dr. Radhakrishnan has performed at Bengaluru Sangeethotsav, Sankranthi Music Festival of RK Srikantan Trust, Swaralaya, Bangalore Centre for Kathakali and Arts, JSS Sangeetha Sabha, Chembai Vaidyanatha Bhagavathar Music Festival at Chennai. He has been singing at the Guruvayoor Chembai Sangeetholsavam every year since 2008.

== Major Awards and honours ==
- 2003: K.R. Ramanathan Memorial Gold Medal of Indian Geophysical Union
- 2005: VASVIK Industrial Research Award
- 2006: Silver Jubilee Honour by Ministry of Earth Sciences
- 2008: BHASKARA Award of Indian Society of Remote Sensing
- 2008: Dr. Y. Nayudamma Memorial Award of the A.P Academy of Sciences
- 2009: Social Sciences Award of the International Academy of Astronautics
- 2010: Vikram Sarabhai Memorial Award of Indian Science Congress
- 2010: Distinguished Alumnus Award of IIT, Kharagpur
- 2010: Distinguished Alumnus Award of IIM, Bangalore
- 2014: ISRO's Lifetime Achievement Award
- 2014: The Allan D. Emil Award of International Astronautical Federation
- 2014: Ernst & Young Lifetime Achievement Award
- 2014: Technovation-Sarabhai Award of Indian Electronics & Semiconductor Association
- 2014: Radhakrishnan received the Padma Bhushan Award for contribution to Science and Engineering, especially in the field of Space Science and Technology.
- 2014: Named one of Nature's ten "people who mattered" of 2014 on 18 December 2014, along with Radhika Nagpal, and others.
- 2015: Lifetime Achievement Award of Union Bank of India
- 2015: Lifetime Outstanding Innovation Award Indore Management Association
- 2015: Bharat Asmita Vigyan Tantragyaan Shreshta
- 2015: P.C. Chandra Purashkar for Lifetime Achievement
- 2016: Asian Scientist 100, Asian Scientist
- 2016: Lifetime Achievement Award, Engineers' Forum, Nagpur
- 2017: Global Indian (Science) Award of Times Network
- 2018: Qimpro Platinum Standard 2018 (Business)

He has been conferred a doctorate by IIT Kharagpur and honorary doctorates by 12 Indian universities.

Government offices
Preceded by G. Madhavan Nair	Chairman of the Indian Space Research Organisation; 2009–2014	Succeeded by Shailesh Nayak
Preceded by B. N. Suresh	Director, Vikram Sarabhai Space Centre; 2007–2009	Succeeded by P. S. Veeraraghavan
