= Shailesh Nayak =

Indian oceanographer

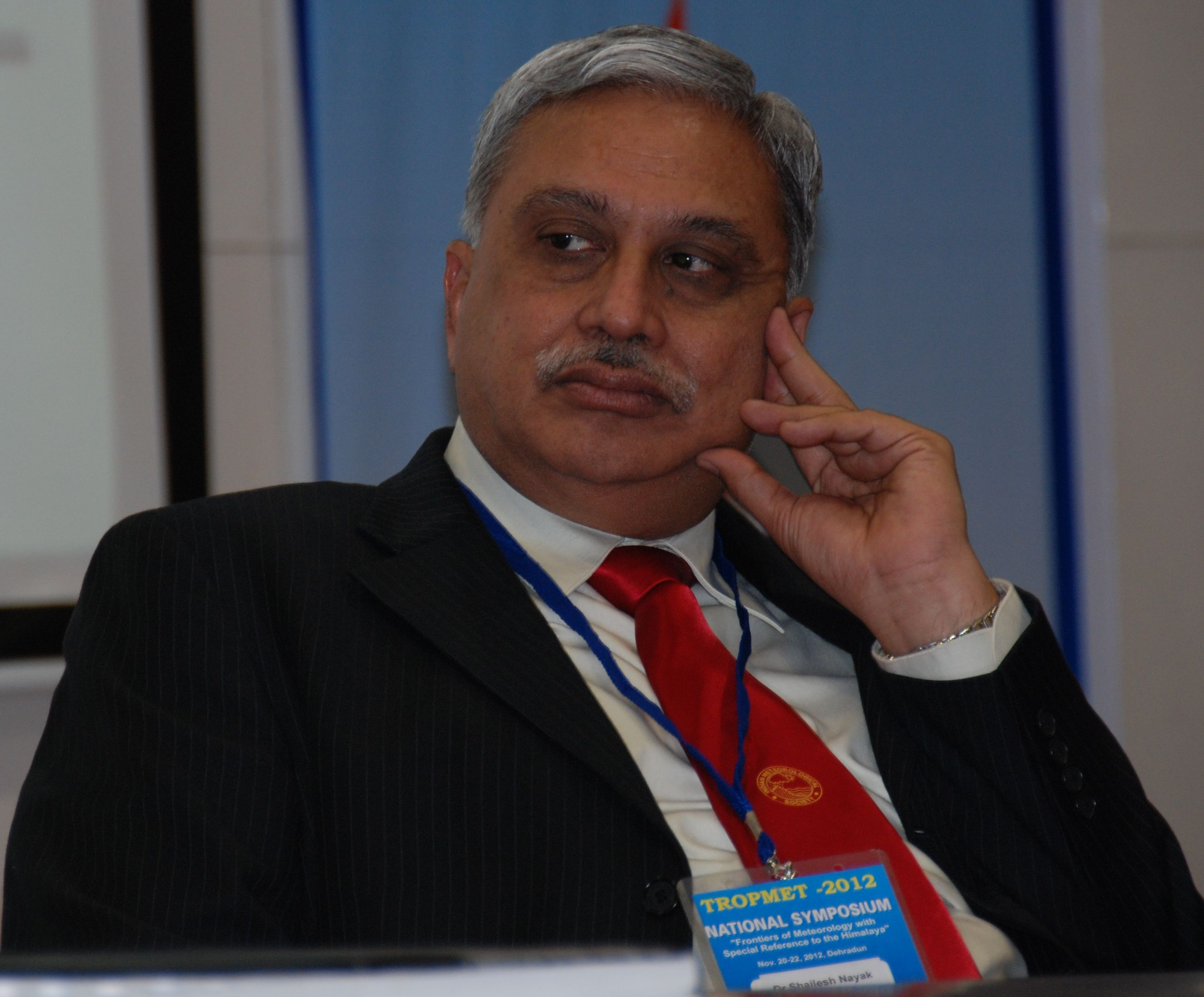
- Shailesh Nayak in 2012

Interim Chairman of ISRO
- In office 1 January 2015 – 12 January 2015
- Preceded by: Koppillil Radhakrishnan
- Succeeded by: A. S. Kiran Kumar

Personal details
- Born: 21 August 1953 (age 73) Billimora, Navsari, Gujarat, India
- Scientific career
- Fields: Oceanography, Geology and Remote sensing
- Workplaces: Ministry of Earth Sciences, Govt of India

Shailesh Nayak (born 21 August 1953) is an Indian scientist and is currently Director of the National Institute of Advanced Studies from 2018 onwards, former Chancellor of TERI School of Advanced Studies (2019–2025) and Distinguished Scientist in the Ministry of Earth Sciences. He was the Earth System Science Organization (ESSO) Chair and Secretary to the Government of India for Ministry of Earth Sciences (MoES) Indian government, between August 2008 – 2015. He was also the Chairman of the Earth Commission in India. He served as the interim chairman of ISRO between 31 December 2014 and 11 January 2015.

He has also served as director of the Indian National Centre for Ocean Information Services, INCOIS, Hyderabad, India, an autonomous institution under ESSO (May 2006 to July 2008). At ESSO-INCOIS, he set up a state-of-the-art Early Warning System for Tsunami and Storm Surges in the Indian Ocean. He was responsible for the conceptualization and development of Marine GIS. He made outstanding contributions in improving advisory services related to potential fishing zones, ocean state forecast, and Indian Argo project.

He has been providing leadership for the programs related to science of climate change, weather services, polar science, ocean science and modeling, ocean survey, resources, and technology. He chaired an expert group and helped to establish a national GIS in the country.

== Personal life ==
Nayak was born on 21 August 1953, at Billimora, Navsari in Gujarat, India. He did his Ph.D. in geology in 1980 from M. S. University of Baroda, Vadodara and specialized in Oceanography, Remote sensing. He has also served in ISRO, his area of research includes Coastal and Ocean processes and ocean-atmosphere interaction, coastal geomorphology, hazards. He was honoured with an Honorary Doctorate of Science by Andhra University in 2011 and Assam University in 2013. He is recognized as a Ph.D. Guide by six Universities, and six students have obtained Ph.D. under his supervision. He has published more than 100 papers in journals, conferences and reports. On August 31, 2015, he relinquished his post of Secretary of Ministry of Earth Sciences, Indian Government.

== Positions held ==
He has served ISRO and MoES in several capacities namely:

- 2014 - Chairman, ISRO
- 2008 - Secretary, Ministry of Earth Sciences (MoES) and chairman, Earth Commission, India
- 2006 - Director, Indian National Centre for Ocean Information Services, INCOIS, Hyderabad
- 2001 - Group director, Marine & Water Resources, Space Applications Centre, ISRO, Ahmedabad
- 1978 - Joined Space Applications Centre, ISRO, Ahmedabad

He has held several key positions namely:

- Chair, Regional Integrated Multi-hazard Early Warning System (RIMES) and the Indian Ocean Observing System Resource Forum (IRF)
- President, Indian Meteorological Society (IMS)
- President, Indian Society of Geomatics (ISG)
- Vice-chair, Inter-Governmental Coordinating Group on Indian Ocean Tsunami Warning System (ICG-IOTWS) (2007–2011)
- President, ISRS, Dehradun
- Chairman, Indian Ocean–Global Ocean Observing System (IO-GOOS) (2006–10)
- President, ISPRS Technical Commission (TC) IV on ‘Geo-databases and Digital Mapping’ for the term 2004–08

== Academic and research activities ==
Following are the highlights of his career as a renowned scientist:

- Disaster management: Provided leadership to set up a state-of-the-art Tsunami Warning Centre within two years within stipulated time and cost. Interacted with fourteen institutes from four different ministries to develop entire tsunami warning system.
- Fishery service for social benefit: Developed methodology for potential fishing zones for saving fuel and time while at the Space Applications Centre (SAC) and continued to improve further while at INCOIS, both methodology and dissemination. Initiated tuna forecast on an experimental basis.
- Marine weather for safe navigation: Operationalized service related to ocean state (height and direction of wave and swell) for the entire Indian Ocean.
- Database organization: Conceptualised and developing Marine GIS for the country. A marine data centre has been established at INCOIS and data is being provided to web.
- Generation of database for coastal zone management: Created satellite-derived benchmark database systematically on coastal landforms, mangroves, coral reef and shoreline change, high and low tide lines for the entire Indian coast for the first time.
- Development of technique and algorithms: Developed techniques for identifying various coastal landforms, mangrove plant communities as well as high tide line and low tide line. Directed research in development of algorithms for retrieving the information on chlorophyll and coloured dissolved organic matter (CDOM) and other bio-geo-chemical parameters from the space-based satellite data. The software has been installed in about twenty agencies in the country to utilise Ocean Colour Monitor (OCM) data.

He has contributed immensely towards the advancement of research in Science and Technology in leading institutes of India in various capacities:

- Chairman of the Research Advisory Committee of the National Institute of Oceanography, Goa
- Chairman of the Research Advisory Committee of the Centre for Earth Science Studies, Thiruvananthapuram
- Chairman of the Research Advisory Committee of the Defence Terrain Research Laboratory, Delhi
- Chair, Governing Board, Birbal Sahni Institute of Paleobotany, Lucknow
- Chair, Governing Board, Wadia Institute of Himalayan Geology, Dehradun
- Member of many national committees related to earth science, coastal protection, mangrove, coral reef, and coastal zone management

== Fellow and member of professional bodies ==
- Fellow, Indian Academy of Sciences, Bangalore
- Fellow, National Academy of Sciences, India, Allah Abad.
- Fellow, International Society of Photogrammetry and Remote Sensing (ISPRS), 2012
- Member, International Academy of Astronautics, Paris.
- Fellow, Indian Society of Remote Sensing (ISRS), 2011
- Fellow, Geological Society of India, Bangalore
- Fellow, Meteorological Society of India
- Life Member, Indian Society of Remote Sensing, Dehradun
- Life Member, Indian Society of Geomatics, Ahmedabad
- Life Member, Institution of Geoscientists (India), Hyderabad
- Life Member, Mangrove Society of India, Goa
- Life Member, Astronautical Society of India, Bangalore
- Life Member, Meteorological Society of India, New Delhi

== Honours and awards ==
- 'Padma Shri' in the field of science and engineering in 2024.
- Honorary Doctor of Science by Assam University, 2013
- Vikram Sarabhai Memorial Award 2012
- Honorary Doctor of Science by Andhra University, 2011
- Special Achievement in GIS (SAG) Award -2008, E.S.R.I., San Diego, USA (for Tsunami Warning Centre)
- Skotch Challenger Award for Security and Disaster Management, Jan. 2009 (for setting up Tsunami Warning Centre) by Skotch, New Delhi
- Bhaskara Award for 2009
- Gold Medal of Indian Geophysical Union 2009
- National Mineral Award-2005, (Applied Geology) Ministry of Mines, Govt. of India
- Indian National Remote Sensing Award for the Year 1994, Indian Society of Remote Sensing, Dehradun
- Hari-Om Ashram Prerit Inter-University Smarak Trust Prize for the Year 1981-82 for Geology
- Dinesh Chokshi Memorial prize for securing highest marks in M.Sc. (Geology) in 1975

Government offices
Preceded by K. Radhakrishnan	ISRO Chairman; 1 January 2015 to 12 January 2015	Succeeded by A. S. Kiran Kumar
