= G. Madhavan Nair =

Indian aerospace engineer

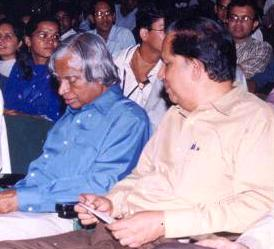
- Nair (right) with A. P. J. Abdul Kalam, 2002

6th Chairman of ISRO
- In office 1 September 2003 – 29 October 2009
- Preceded by: Krishnaswamy Kasturirangan
- Succeeded by: Koppillil Radhakrishnan

Personal details
- Born: 31 October 1943 (age 82) Thirunanthikarai, Kulasekharam, Kingdom of Travancore, British India (present day Kanyakumari), Tamil Nadu, India
- Parent: Gopala Pillai (father)
- Education: University of Kerala (Bachelor of Science)
- Known for: Indian Space Program
- Awards: Padma Bhushan (1998); Padma Vibhushan (2009)
- Scientific career
- Fields: Rocket Technology and Electrical and Electronics Engineering
- Workplaces: Indian Space Research Organisation; Bhabha Atomic Research Center

G. Madhavan Nair (born 31 October 1943) is an Indian space scientist and a former chairman of ISRO, and Secretary to the Department of Space, Government of India. His tenure saw commencement of Indian Human Spaceflight Programme and launch of extraterrestrial exploration mission Chandrayaan-I.

He was Chairman of the Board of Governors of the Indian Institute of Technology Patna until he stepped down due to his involvement in a controversial deal relating to sale of radio spectrum bandwidth involving Antrix. He was subsequently barred from holding any private position.

Nair was awarded the Padma Vibhushan, India's second highest civilian honour, on 26 January 2009.

== Early life ==
Madhavan was born in Kulasekharam, Travancore State, (now in Kanyakumari district, Tamil Nadu), India. When Kanyakumari district became part of Tamil Nadu, Madhavan Nair’s father Gopala Pillai moved to Thiruvananthapuram. He graduated with a B.Sc. in Engineering (1966) from College of Engineering, Thiruvananthapuram, of the University of Kerala with specialization in Electronics & Communication Engineering. After his graduation, Nair attended a training program at the Bhabha Atomic Research Center (BARC) Training School, Mumbai.

== Career ==
Madhavan Nair is a leading technologist in the field of rocket systems and has made significant contribution to the development of multi-stage satellite launch vehicles, achieving self-reliance in independent access to space using indigenous technologies. Nair and his team have advanced their work in the face of several challenges in the regime of technology denials by adopting several innovations and novel techniques to realise world class launch vehicle systems. India today has a pride of place amongst the space-faring nations in launch vehicle technology. Specifically, as Project Director, he led the development of Polar Satellite Launch Vehicle (PSLV) which has since become the workhorse for launching mainly Indian remote sensing satellites.

As Director of ISRO's largest R & D Centre, the Vikram Sarabhai Space Centre, he also saw India's Geo-synchronous Satellite Launch Vehicle (GSLV) successfully come to fruition. Further, as Director of the Liquid Propulsion Systems Centre of ISRO, he played a central role in the design and development of the crucial cryogenic engine for GSLV. A list of Positions held before is listed below:

2010–?	Chairman, Centre for Management Development, Thiruvananthapuram
2003–2009	Chairman, Indian Space Research Organisation, Bangalore
1999–2003	Director, Vikram Sarabhai Space Centre, Thiruvananthapuram
1995–1999	Director, Liquid Propulsion Systems Centre, Thiruvananthapuram
1994–1996	Programme Director, ILVP, VSSC, Thiruvananthapuram
1988–1995	Project Director, PSLV, Thiruvananthapuram
1984–1988	Associate Project Director, PSLV, Thiruvananthapuram
1980–1984	Head, Electronics Systems, VSSC, Thiruvananthapuram
1974–1980	Project Engineer, SLV-3 Project, Thiruvananthapuram
1972–1974	Project Manager, Telecommand System, VSSC, Thiruvananthapuram
1967–1972	Head, Payload Integration Section, TERLS, Thiruvananthapuram

== As Chairman of ISRO ==
As the Chairman of Indian Space Research Organization, Nair is entrusted with the responsibility for the development of space technology and its application to national development. During his tenure as Chairman, ISRO/Secretary, DOS, twenty seven successful missions were accomplished i.e., INSAT-3E, Resourcesat-1, Edusat, Cartosat-1, Hamsat-1, INSAT-4A, PSLV-C5, GSLV-F01, PSLV-C6, Cartosat-2, INSAT-4B, SRE-1, PSLV-C7, PSLV-C8, GSLV-F04, INSAT-4CR, PSLV-C10, Cartosat-2A, IMS-1, PSLV-C9, Chandrayaan-1, PSLV-C11, PSLV-C12, RISAT-2, ANUSAT, PSLV-C14 and Ocensat-2. He has taken initiatives towards development of futuristic technologies to enhance the space systems capabilities as well as to reduce the cost of access to space. Nair has given major thrust for evolving application programmes such as tele-education and telemedicine for meeting the needs of society at large. As Chairman Space Commission, Nair is responsible for chalking out the future plan for space research in the country. Major thrust are in scientific exploration of outer space using the Astrosat and Chandrayaan (Moon) missions apart from implementing schemes for telemedicine, tele-education and disaster management support systems. He is also providing guidance and leadership in undertaking new technology developments related to launch vehicle, spacecraft for communication, remote sensing and applications programmes to meet societal needs.

In the international arena, Nair has led the Indian delegations for bilateral cooperation and negotiations with many Space Agencies and Countries, specially with France, Russia, Brazil, Israel, etc., and has been instrumental in working out mutually beneficial international cooperative agreements. Nair has led the Indian delegation to the S&T Sub-Committee of United Nations Committee on Peaceful Uses of Outer Space (UN-COPUOS) since 1998.

His main focus has always been to achieve self-reliance in the high technology areas and to bring the benefits of space technology to India's development, specially targeting the needs of the rural and poor sections of society.

== Establishment of the Indian Institute of Space Science and Technology ==
G. Madhavan Nair initiated and implemented the establishment of Indian Institute of Space Science and Technology in Thiruvananthapuram. There were some objections and impediments in its establishment.

== Controversies in S-Band Devas Scam ==
The contract signed between Antrix Corporation and Devas Multimedia Private Limited on 28 January 2005 during Nair's tenure as chairman of ISRO and secretary of Department of Space, was controversial. As a consequence of it, on 25 January 2012 he was barred from holding any government jobs. As of August 2017, he was still awaiting trial.

== Additional responsibilities ==
Nair has promoted space science and technology for the socio-economic benefit of India, he is also the chairman of the Governing Body of the Antrix Corporation, Bangalore. He was chairman of the National Remote Sensing Agency until it became National Remote Sensing Centre.

He was president of Astronautical Society of India in 2004 and of the Aeronautical Society of India in 2005, as well as vice-president of the Scientific Activities Committee of the International Academy of Astronautics (IAA) from 2006. In August 2009, he was elected president of the IAA. He is the only Indian and the first non-American to IAA.

Nair was General President of the 97th Indian Science Congress 2009-2010 and first chairman of the board of governors of Indian Institute of Technology Patna.

== Awards ==
Nair has won several awards such as National Aeronautical Award, FIE Foundation's Award, Shri Om Prakash Bhasin Award, Swadeshi Sastra Puraskar Award, Vikram Sarabhai Memorial Gold Medal of the Indian Science Congress Association, Dr.Yelavarthy Nayudamma Memorial Award-2004, HK Firodia Award-2005, Fifth "Shri Balvantbhai Parekh Award", Lokmanya Tilak Award from Tilak Smarak Trust, "Sree Chithira Thirunal Award" from Sree Chithira Thirunal Trust, "MP Birla Memorial Award 2009", "Bhu Ratna Award", "Mohamed Abdu Rahiman Sahib National Award", "AV Rama Rao Technology Award", "Chanakya Award" etc., He has also received Gold Medal from the Prime Minister at the 94th Indian Science Congress at Chidambaram in 2007. He received M M Chugani award for 2006, conferred by Indian Physics Association at IIT Mumbai during March 2008. He was also conferred with "Raja Rammohan Puraskar" award on the 236th birth anniversary of Raja Rammohan Roy at Kolkata during May 2008.. Dr. Nair was conferred with Rajiv Gandhi Outstanding Leadership National Award for the Year-2009 by the Academy of Grassroots Studies and Research of India (AGRASRI), Tirupati, by Dr. Agarala Easwara Reddi, Former Speaker of AP Legislative Assembly on 20 August 2009 at Tirupati. Dr. G. Madhavan Nair delivered the 8th Rajiv Gandhi Memorial Lecture on 20 August 2009 at Tirupati, held under the aegis of AGRASRI, Tirupati.

The Government of India awarded Nair the Padma Bhushan in 1998 and the Padma Vibhushan in 2009.

Nair has received numerous honorary degrees, including:

- D.Philosophy: Punjab Technical University, Jalandhar (2003).
- D.Sc.: Sri Venkateswara University, Tirupati (2004), Indian Institute of Technology Delhi (2004), Rani Durgavati Vishwavidyalaya, Jabalpur (2005), Indira Gandhi National Open University, Delhi (2005), Rani Durgavati Vishwavidyalaya, Jabalpur (2005), Cochin University of Science and Technology, Kochi (2006), Rajiv Gandhi Technical University, Bhopal (2007), University of Kerala, Kerala (2007), SRM Institute of Science and Technology, Chennai (2008), Pandit Ravishankar Shukla University, Raipur (2009), Karnatak University, Dharwad (2009), Indian Institute of Technology Bombay (2009), Indian Institute of Technology Kharagpur (2009)
- Honorary Doctorate by Suresh Gyan Vihar University, Jaipur (2014)
- Honorary Doctorate by Amity University, Gurgaon 2015

== Fellowships/Memberships ==
- Fellow, Indian National Academy of Engineering.
- Fellow, Astronautical Society of India.
- Fellow, National Academy of Sciences, India.
- Honorary Fellow, Indian Society for Non-Destruction Testing (ISNT).
- Member, System Society of India.
- Member, Working Committee of the Current Science Association 2004-06.
- Member, International Academy of Astronautics (2004).
- Senior Associate, National Institute of Advanced Studies (2004–2007).
- President, Intersputnik Board (2005)
- Honorary Fellow of The Aeronautical Society of India (2007).
- Honorary Life fellow Institution of Engineers (India) Kolkata (2008)
- Chairman, Research Council of National Aerospace Laboratories (April 2007 to March 2010).
- President of the International Academy of Astronautics (2009)

== Publications ==
In August 2017, Nair's autobiography, titled Agnipareekshakal, was published. English translation of autobiography, titled “Rocketing through the skies : An eventful life at ISRO” was published in August 2023.

== See also ==
- Chairman of the Indian Space Research Organization

Government offices
Preceded by Krishnaswami Kasturirangan	Chairman of the Indian Space Research Organisation; 2003 - 2009	Succeeded by K. Radhakrishnan
Preceded by S. Srinivasan	Director, Vikram Sarabhai Space Centre; 1999 - 2003	Succeeded by B. N. Suresh
