= NARL =

NARL may refer to:

- NARL, a section of Utqiagvik, Alaska, United States
- North American Rugby League, a professional rugby league in North America
- National Atmospheric Research Laboratory, an Indian research laboratory
