= Chairperson of ISRO =

Indian government official

Chairperson of the Indian Space Research Organisation

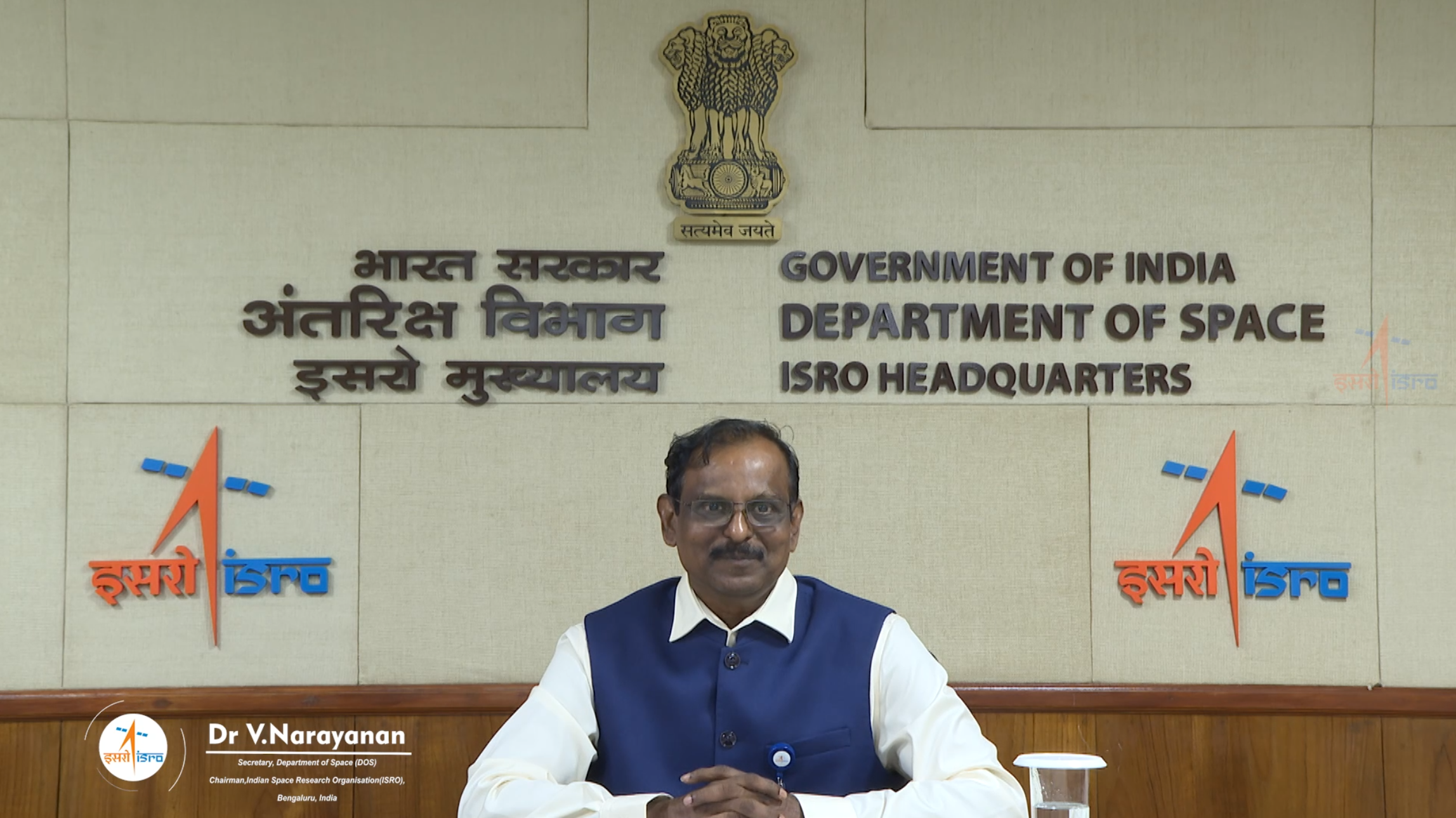
- Incumbent; V. Narayanan since 14 January 2025
- Type: Chairman
- Status: Head of ISRO
- Reports to: Prime Minister of India
- Appointer: Appointments Committee of the Cabinet of Government
- Precursor: Chairman of Indian National Committee for Space Research & Secretary, Department of Space
- Inaugural holder: Vikram Sarabhai
- Formation: 1963 (as chairman of INCOSPAR)
- Salary: ₹2.5 lakh (US$2,600) (Monthly basic)
- Website: Chairman ISRO, Secretary DOS

The Chairperson of the Indian Space Research Organisation is the statutory head of ISRO. The officeholder is a secretary to the Government of India and an executive of the Department of Space (DoS) which directly reports to the Prime Minister of India.

The Indian National Committee for Space Research (INCOSPAR) was founded in 1962 under the Department of Atomic Energy (DAE) with Vikram Sarabhai as its chairperson which in 1969 became ISRO. In 1972, government of India had set up a space commission and DoS and brought ISRO under DoS.

Since Sarabhai assumed the position, there have been eleven chairmen of the ISRO, with Satish Dhawan serving the longest term of 12 years as the chairman.

Recently on 8 January 2025, The Central Government has appointed Dr. V. Narayanan, currently the director of Liquid Propulsion Systems Centre (LPSC), Thiruvananthapuram, as the new chairperson of ISRO, and also as the secretary of the DoS.

== List of chairpersons of ISRO ==
No.	Portrait	Name (Lifespan)	Term			Ref(s)
No.	Portrait	Name (Lifespan)	Start	End	Duration	Ref(s)
1		Vikram Sarabhai (1919–1971)	1963	1971	8 years	
1		Vikram Sarabhai (1919–1971)	Founder of INCOSPAR and widely regarded as father of Indian space program. His efforts led to creation of Indian Space Research Organisation.		8 years	
2		M. G. K. Menon (1928–2016)	January 1972	September 1972	9 months	
2		M. G. K. Menon (1928–2016)	He was notable mostly for his work on cosmic rays and particle physics particularly on the high-energy inter-actions of elementary particles.		9 months	
3		Satish Dhawan (1920–2002)	1973	1984	12 years	
3		Satish Dhawan (1920–2002)	Satish Dhawan is known for his work on fluid dynamics and his tenure as longest serving chief of ISRO. His era was marked by India attaining orbital launch capability in 1980 for the first time and start of INSAT program which became base for further development of spacecraft technologies.		12 years	
4		Udupi Ramachandra Rao (1932–2017)	1984	1994	10 years	
4		Udupi Ramachandra Rao (1932–2017)	Also served as chancellor of Indian Institute of Space Science and Technology; Rao pushed for launch vehicle development which subsequently led to realisation of PSLV and later GSLV rockets, marked as key boosts to India's space capabilities. Launch capabilities with INSAT program eventually turned India into a major spacefaring nation.		10 years	
5		Krishnaswamy Kasturirangan (1940–2025)	1994	27 August 2003	9 years	
5		Krishnaswamy Kasturirangan (1940–2025)	His era marked development of improved spacecraft in INSAT series and development of IRS series of remote sensing satellites and major improvements in earth observation satellite technologies. His tenure also saw operationalisation of PSLVs and first flight of GSLV which made India self sufficient launching its smaller & medium EO satellites.		9 years	
6		G. Madhavan Nair (1943– )	1 September 2003	29 October 2009	6 years, 58 days	
6		G. Madhavan Nair (1943– )	Nair holds significant expertise on development of multi-stage launch vehicles and his era witnessed operationalisation of various variants of PSLV rocket. His tenure saw commencement of Indian Human Spaceflight Programme and launch of extraterrestrial exploration mission Chandrayaan-I. Following a controversial S-band spectrum deal involving Antrix Corporation, he had to step down.		6 years, 58 days	
7		Koppillil Radhakrishnan (1949–)	30 October 2009	31 December 2014	5 years, 62 days	
7		Koppillil Radhakrishnan (1949–)	He joined VSSC as a development engineer for electro-mechanical devices of launch vehicles and later oversaw annual budget and plans and database for resources. Introduction of IRNSS made India one of few countries with own navigation systems while introduction of GSLV Mk III later enabled India to launch its heavier satellites also. His era also witnessed successful launch and orbital insertion of Mars Orbiter Mission, India's first Mars mission and cancellation of collaboration with Russia and redefining Chandrayaan-2 with Indian design and systems. Successful flight of India's own cryogenic stage on GSLV-D5 made it one of six countries with full launch capabilities. (Note: Others include NASA (United States), RFSA (Russia), European Space Agency (EU), CNSA (China) and JAXA (Japan).)		5 years, 62 days	
-		Shailesh Nayak (1953– )	1 January 2015	12 January 2015	11 days	
-		Shailesh Nayak (1953– )	He was primarily engaged with studies related to oceanography and remote sensing and served as interim chief of ISRO for a brief period of 11 days.		11 days	
8		A. S. Kiran Kumar (1952– )	14 January 2015	14 January 2018	3 years, 0 days	
8		A. S. Kiran Kumar (1952– )	His tenure is attributed to HEX which marks beginning of development of reusable-launch vehicle, first orbital flight of GSLV Mk III, completion of NAVIC and launch of Astrosat, India's first space based observatory.		3 years, 0 days	
9		K. Sivan (1957– )	15 January 2018	15 January 2022	4 years, 0 days	
9		K. Sivan (1957– )	He earlier served as director of VSSC and LPSC and participated in development of PSLV rockets. His tenure was marked by the Chandrayaan-2 project which resulted in a failed Moon landing. His tenure also saw the acceleration of India's crewed space program. Short-term goals include launch of Chandrayaan-3 to attempt a successful soft lunar landing, putting humans in space, launching missions to Venus and the Sun and development of SCE-200 rocket engine to facilitate realisation of India's heavy lift launch vehicle and increase commercial operations. He is also known for developing trajectory simulation software named SITARA which is still in use by ISRO.		4 years, 0 days	
10		S. Somanath (1963– )	15 January 2022	13 January 2025	2 years, 364 days	
10		S. Somanath (1963– )	Somanath is known for his contributions to launch vehicle design, particularly in the areas of launch vehicle systems engineering, structural design, structural dynamics, and pyrotechnics. He also served as the Director of Vikram Sarabhai Space Centre, Thiruvananthapuram and Director of Liquid Propulsion Systems Centre, Thiruvananthapuram. He was associated with the PSLV project and was the project director of GSLV Mk III in 2010. In his tenure in 2023, India successfully launched Chandrayan-3 and successfully made a soft landing in the South Pole making it the first country to make a successful soft landing in the South Pole.		2 years, 364 days	
11		V. Narayanan (1964– )	14 January 2025	Incumbent	1 year, 254 days	
11		V. Narayanan (1964– )	V. Narayanan is known for his contributions to launch vehicle engine, particularly in the areas of launch vehicle engine engineering.		1 year, 254 days	

== See also ==
- Similar positions worldwide
  - Canada: President of the Canadian Space Agency
  - Europe: Director General of the European Space Agency
  - Russia: General Director of Roscosmos
  - United States: Administrator of NASA
