= A. S. Kiran Kumar =

Indian space scientist

Aluru Seelin Kiran Kumar
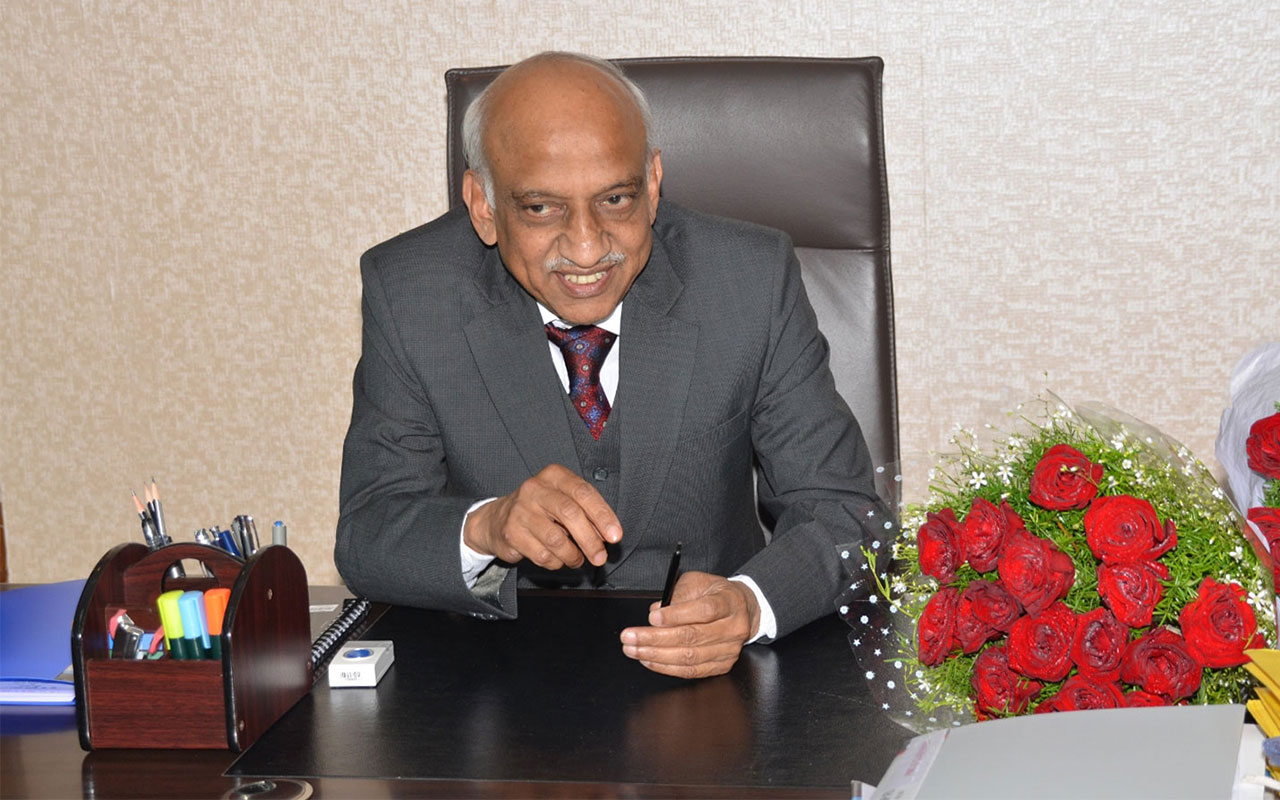

8th Chairman of ISRO
- In office 14 January 2015 – 14 January 2018
- Preceded by: Shailesh Nayak
- Succeeded by: K. Sivan

Personal details
- Born: 22 October 1952 (age 73) Alur, Hassan district, Mysore State (now Karnataka), India
- Education: Bangalore University, Indian Institute of Science, Bangalore
- Known for: Chairman of the Indian Space Research Organisation
- Awards: Padma Shri
- Scientific career
- Fields: Space research and Electro-optics
- Workplaces: Space Applications Centre

Aluru Seelin Kiran Kumar (born 22 October 1952) is an Indian space scientist, member of board of governors of the Indian Institute of Technology Jodhpur and former chairman of ISRO, having assumed office on 14 January 2015. He is credited with the development of key scientific instruments aboard the Chandrayaan-1 and Mangalyaan space crafts. In 2014, he was awarded the Padma Shri, India's fourth highest civilian award, for his contributions to the fields of science and technology. Kiran Kumar previously served as Director of the Space Applications Centre in Ahmedabad.

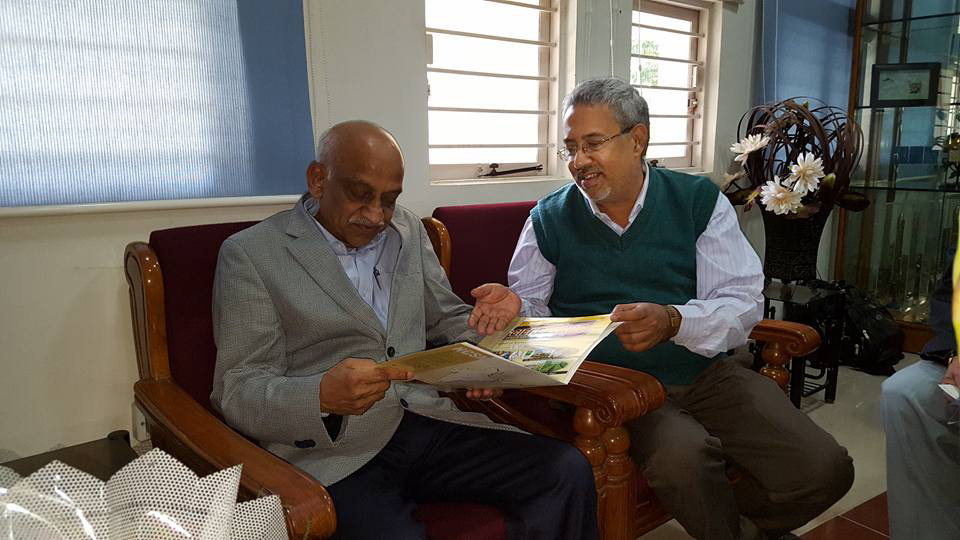
Narayan Ramdas Iyer, Head of the Raman Science Centre and Planetarium, Nagpur discussing communicating science to students and how the Indian Space Research Organisation(ISRO) can help in the venture with A.S.Kiran Kumar, Chairman ISRO.

== Biography ==
Space Applications Centre lists Kiran Kumar's achievements as:

- Development of III tier imaging for satellites such as IRS-1C and Resourcesat-1
- Development of Ocean Colour instruments for PFZ forecast
- Development of stereo imaging system for Cartosat-1
- Development of sub-meter resolution optical imaging for Cartosat-2
- Development of 2-channel and 3-channel VHRR meteorological payloads
- Development of third generation Imagers and sounders
- Development of Terrain Mapping Camera and Hyper Spectral Imager for Chandrayaan-2

Chandrayaan-1 spacecraft - Artist's concept

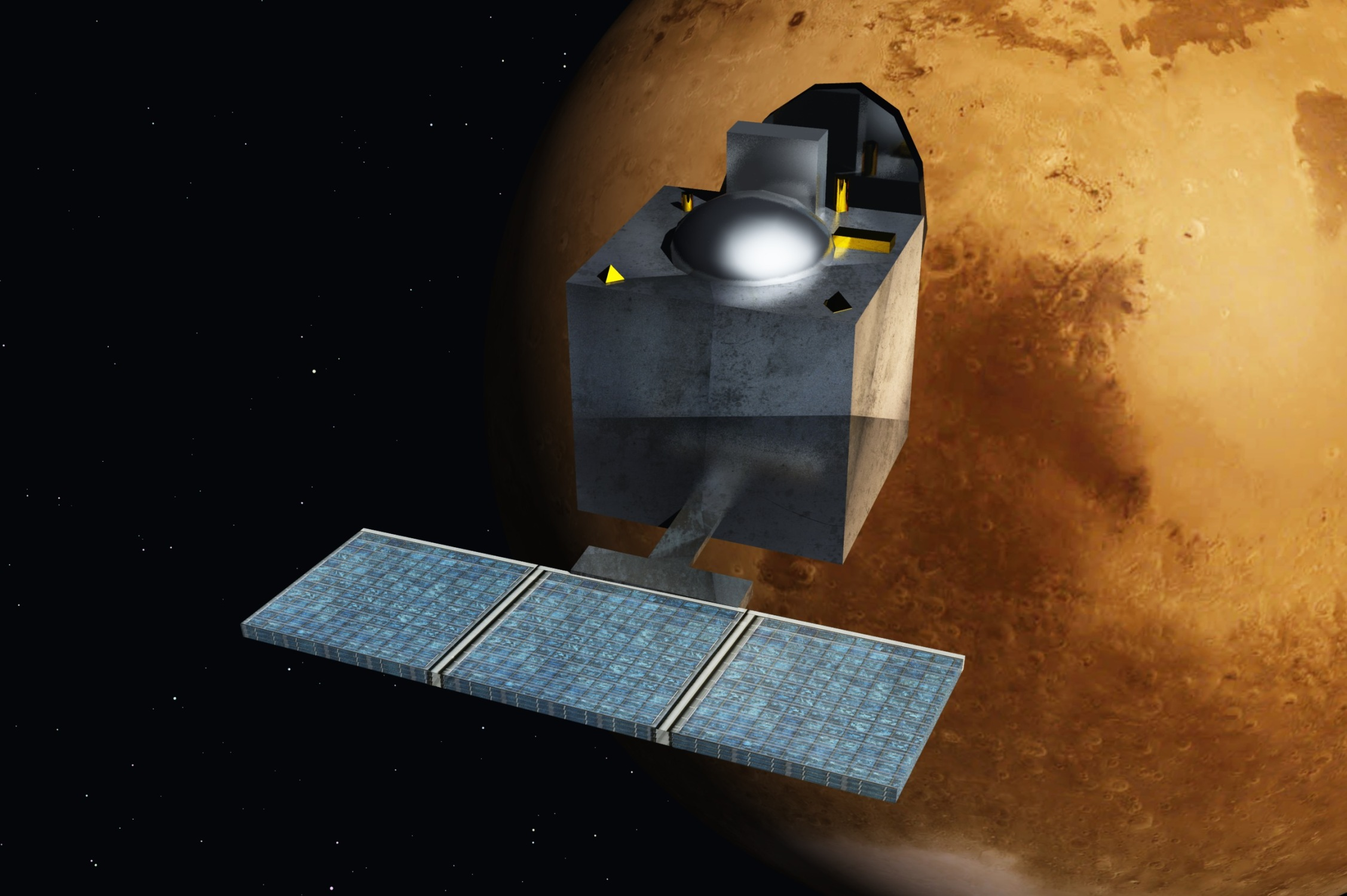
Mars Orbiter Mission - India - Artist's concept

Kiran Kumar Aluru Seelin was born in a veerashaiva Lingayat religion in Hassan District in 1952, in the Indian state of Karnataka. He graduated in physics (Honours) in 1971, from the National College of Bangalore University. This was followed by a degree of MSc in Electronics from the same university, in 1973. His further studies were at the Indian Institute of Science, Bangalore from where he passed MTech in Physical Engineering, in 1975.

Kiran Kumar started his career, joining Space Applications Centre, Ahmedabad, in 1975, working on Space borne Electro -optical imaging instruments. He has remained at the institution ever since and has been the Director of the Electro-optical Systems Group since April 2012. He also served as the chairman of ISRO from January 2015 to January 2018. He has represented the Indian Space Research Organisation at many international forums such as the World Meteorological Organisation and Indo-US Joint Working Group on Civil Space Cooperation and holds the Chair of the ISRO at the Committee on Earth Observation Satellites (CEO).

== Legacy ==
Kiran Kumar's legacy spans across his contributions to the scientific world, specifically Indian space endeavours, and his efforts towards the dissemination of knowledge by way of articles and lectures.

=== Scientific contributions ===
Kiran Kumar is known to have made contributions to the Indian space programmes, from the early projects like Bhaskara TV payload till the later programmes such as Chandrayaan-1 and Mangalyaan. Kumar is credited with the design and development of the electro-optical image sensors used in India's first remote sensing satellite, Bhaskara, launched in 1979 and the subsequent one in 1981, as well as the ocean colour instruments used in weather forecasting, sea zone/landscape mapping and telecommunications.

He is also reported to have contributed to the design and development of the imaging instruments for projects such as INSAT–3D, Resourcesat, Micro Satellite and Cartosat. The Terrain Mapping Camera and Hyperspectral Imager payloads of Chandrayaan-1 project is also credited to the efforts of Kiran Kumar. It was the group led by Kumar which developed three of the five scientific instruments.

=== Academic contributions ===
Kumar has attended many seminars and conferences where he has delivered lectures and keynote addresses. He has also published several articles in peer-reviewed international journals, ResearchGate has listed 41 of his articles.

- Prakash Chauhan; Prabhjot Kaur; Satadru Bhattacharya; Aditya K. Dagar; A. S. Kiran Kumar (2014). "DETECTION OF OH/H2O ON THE CENTRAL PEAK OF JACKSON CRATER FROM MOON MINERALOGICAL MAPPER (M3) DATA ONBOARD CHANDRAYAAN-1". Research Gate.
- Suchandra Bhowmick; Raj Kumar; A. S. Kiran Kumar (2014). "Cross Calibration of the OceanSAT -2 Scatterometer With QuikSCAT Scatterometer Using Natural Terrestrial Targets". Research Gate.
- A. S. Arya; Phani Rajasekhar Rudravaram; Amitabh Singh; Barla Gopala Krishna; Ajai Prof; kiran kumar alur Seelin (2014). "Morphometric, rheological and compositional analysis of an effusive lunar dome using high resolution remote sensing data sets: A case study from Marius hills region". Research Gate.

== Awards and recognitions ==
The level of precision that is required for such a mission demanded extremely sensitive accelerometers — far superior in quality over the ones we've used in earlier space missions, says Dr. Kiran Kumar about India's Mars Mission

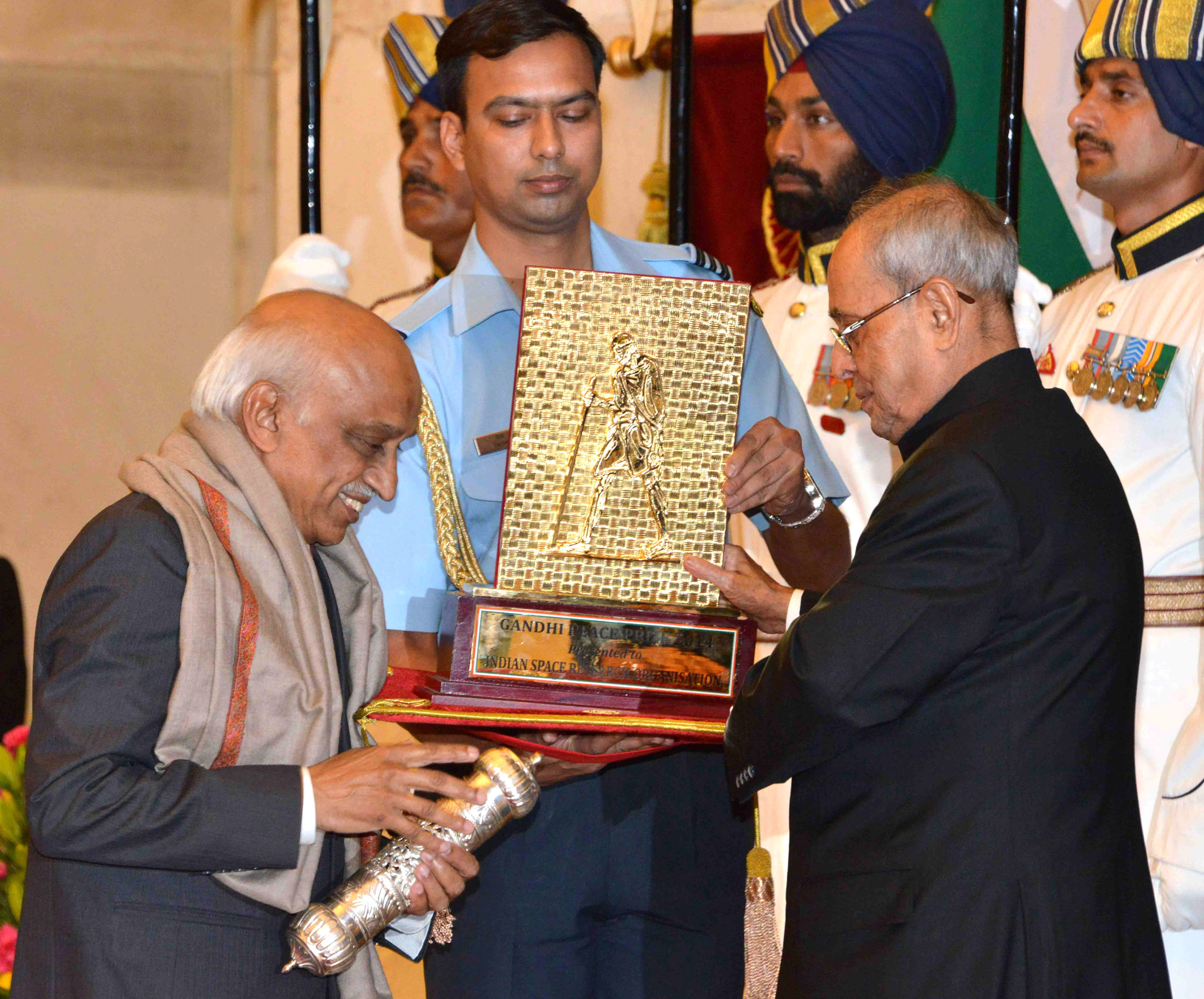
A. S. Kiran Kumar receiving the Gandhi Peace Prize for the Year 2014 for ISRO from the President Pranab Mukherjee.

Kiran Kumar has received many awards and honours, starting with the Indian Society of Remote Sensing Award in 1994. Four years later, in 1998, he received the Vasvik award, followed by the Astronautical Society of India Award in 2001. The Indian Space Research Organisation honoured Kumar with the Individual Service award in 2006 and the Bhaskara Award of the Indian Society of Remote Sensing came his way in 2007. The next year, 2008, saw Kumar getting the Team Achievement Award 2008 of International Academy of Astronautics and the ISRO Performance Award from the Indian Space Research Organisation. Kiran Kumar has been conferred with the fellowship by the National Academy of Engineers, Honorary Life Member of Space Society of Mechanical Engineers (SSME), Ahmedabad and is a corresponding member of the International Academy of Astronautics. The Government of India honoured Kiran Kumar Alur Seelin with the Padma Shri by including him in the 2014 Republic Day Honours. Kiran Kumar was awarded the Honorary Doctorate Degree from GITAM University on 24 March 2015.

- He is the Chairman of Bangalore Association for Science Education (BASE) which administers the premier institute Jawaharlal Nehru Planetarium, Bengaluru.
- In 2017 he was awarded the Vijnan Ratna H K Firodia award for his direction of the Indian space programme in such areas as earth observations, communication, navigation and developed indigenous launch vehicles.
- In 2019 France's highest civilian award - Chevalier de l'Ordre national de la Lgion d'Honneur - for his contribution to India-France space cooperation.
- Shri A.S. Kiran Kumar is the President-Elect of The Aeronautical Society of India.
- He is an Honorary Professor at the Indian Institute of Technology, Gandhinagar.

== See also ==
- Space Applications Centre
- Mars Orbiter Mission
- Indian Space Research Organisation
- Chandrayaan-1

Government offices
Preceded by Shailesh Nayak	Chairman of the Indian Space Research Organisation; 2015–2018	Succeeded by K. Sivan
