= Jay Newman (businessman) =

American novelist and former hedge fund portfolio manager

- Born: 1951 (age 74–75); New York City, U.S.
- Education: Yale University (BA); Columbia University Law School (JD); New York University (LLM)
- Spouse: Elissa Lipcon Kramer
- Children: 4

Jay Newman (born 1951) is an American novelist and a former hedge fund portfolio manager for Elliott Management Corporation who led one of the most notable hedge fund trades in history. His novel about dark money and global politics, Undermoney, was published by Scribner Books in 2022.

== Early life and education ==
Newman was born in New York City in 1951. He graduated magna cum laude with a B.A. in economics from Yale University in 1973. He received his Juris Doctor degree in 1976 from Columbia University, where he was the Harlan Fiske Stone Scholar and editor of the Columbia Law Review. He also earned a Master of Laws degree in Tax Law from New York University in 1981.

== Career ==
=== Finance career ===
Newman spent 40 years in international finance, with a primary focus on managing investments in sovereign debt, including the distressed sovereign debt of Latin American, Eastern European, African, and Asian countries. He has also worked as a trader, investment banker and investor.

His early career included Shearson Lehman/Lehman Brothers, where he established the first trading desk at any Wall Street firm to create liquidity in the defaulted debt of developing countries. As an equity investor, he founded leasing companies in Central and Eastern Europe. He has invested in the debt of dozens of countries and managed negotiations.

Newman was viewed as "the mastermind" behind Elliott Management's historic 15-year fight to recover billions of dollars in defaulted debt from the government of Argentina. The campaign, which included the court-approved seizure of an Argentinian Navy ship in Ghana with 200 people aboard in 2012, reached a successful conclusion in 2016. The Wall Street Journal reported that the settlement to Elliott was for $2.4 billion, "a gain of roughly 10 to 15 times its original investment." The New York Times reported that Elliott's return was "a 392 percent return on the original value of the bonds." The Financial Times said the settlement "is seen as one of the greatest hedge fund trades" in history.

Newman retired from Elliott Management in 2018 but was lured back into the world of sovereign debt recovery in 2021, when he was hired by a group of shareholders of Devas Multimedia, a satellite and telecommunications company embroiled in a fight with the Indian government. Founded by a former Goldman Sachs banker, Devas was awarded about $1.3 billion in arbitration rulings after a contract, which it had with an Indian state-owned company called Antrix to develop broadband, was cancelled a decade ago.

=== Writing career ===
Newman's first novel, Undermoney, was published by Scribner Books on January 25, 2022. It has been described by author Nelson DeMille as "a groundbreaking, unconventional, and wildly entertaining peek behind the curtain of American politics, financial skullduggery, and high-stakes global conflict." Author Lee Child called Undermoney "essential reading - makes your heart beat faster, like a thriller should, but also teaches you something big, which most thrillers don't."

== Personal life ==
Newman lives in [[Miami Beach, Florida]] with his wife Elissa Kramer, who is a retired radiologist. He previously lived in Millerton, New York.
