= TeLEOS-1 =

- Mission type: Navigation
- Operator: AgilSpace
- COSPAR ID: 2015-077D
- SATCAT no.: 41169
- Mission duration: 5 years

Spacecraft properties
- Manufacturer: ST Electronics (Satellite Systems) Pte Ltd
- Launch mass: 400 kilograms (880 lb)
- Power: 1,660 watts

Start of mission
- Launch date: 16 December 2015
- Rocket: PSLV-XL C29
- Launch site: Satish Dhawan SLP
- Contractor: ISRO

Orbital parameters
- Reference system: Geocentric
- Regime: Geosynchronous

TeLEOS-1 is Singapore's first commercial Earth observation satellite launched on a PSLV-C29 vehicle of the Indian Space Research Organisation from Satish Dhawan Space Centre at Sriharikota on 16 December 2015 along with five other satellites developed in Singapore. The satellite is aimed at providing high temporal imagery and geospatial solutions for homeland security and border control; maritime monitoring and disaster management around the equatorial belt. TeLEOS-1 is developed by ST Engineering.

== History ==
In May 2011, ST Electronics (Satcom & Sensor Systems) Pte Ltd, Nanyang Technological University and Defence Science Organisation Laboratories (Singapore) established a joint venture, ST Electronics (Satellite Systems) Pte Ltd (STEE-SatSys), to design, develop and deploy an earth observation satellite with an aim to harness the indigenous potential in satellite development and to check the commercial viability of the satellite. In February 2014, Two independent suppliers of small and microsatellites – ATK Space Systems Inc. of Beltsville MD, United States and ST EE-SatComS - entered into a commercial agreement for the distribution of satellite imagery to the world market. On 5 February 2014, Antrix Corporation, the commercial arm of ISRO, signed a Launch Services Agreement with ST EE-SatComs, Singapore, for the launch of the TeLEOS-1 Earth Observation Satellite. Subsequently, the satellite was launched on 16 December 2015. On 26 July 2016, STEE announced the commencement of its commercial imagery service of the satellite. On 16 February 2016, the first test images of the TeLEOS-1 mission were displayed at the Singapore Airshow 2016.

== Payloads ==
The satellite is equipped with electro-optical camera payload that is capable of performing imaging at ground resolution of down to one metre. It carries 8GB of solid storage for storage of imagery captured by the panchromatic camera.

== Applications ==
The imagery captured by the satellite will be useful in the areas of maritime security and disaster management such as:

- Shipping routes / Sea Lines of Communication
- Pollution (oil slicks, dumping)
- Anchorage monitoring
- Navigation aids and hazards
- Collision avoidance
- Search and rescue
- Natural disasters (earthquake, tsunami)
- Illegal fishing
- Piracy
- Trafficking
- Terrorist threats
- Harbour / Offshore islands protection

== Launch ==
TeLEOS-1, along with five other Singaporean satellites, was launched successfully aboard PSLV-C29 on 16 December 2015. The launch took place at 6 PM local time from Satish Dhawan Space Centre in the southeastern India. The satellite was placed into a 550-kilometer circular orbit inclined at 15 degrees relative to the equator. Singapore government paid 26 million euros ($30 million) for the launch.
