= Acta Astronautica =

- Language: English
- Edited by: Rock Jeng-Shing Chern

Publication details
- Former name: Astronautica Acta
- History: 1955–present
- Publisher: Elsevier
- Frequency: Monthly
- Open access: Hybrid
- Impact factor: 2.954 (2020)

Standard abbreviations
- ISO 4: Acta Astronaut.

Indexing
- CODEN: AASTCF
- ISSN: 0094-5765
- LCCN: 74645400
- OCLC no.: 565552122

Links
- Journal homepage; Online archive

Acta Astronautica is a monthly peer-reviewed scientific journal covering all fields of physical, engineering, life, and social sciences related to the peaceful scientific exploration of space. The journal is widely known as one of the top aerospace engineering journals. The journal was established in 1955 under the name Astronautica Acta, obtaining its current title in 1974, with volume-numbering simultaneously restarting at 1. The journal is published by Elsevier, sponsored by the International Academy of Astronautics.

== Abstracting and indexing ==
The journal is abstracted and indexed in:

- Applied Mechanics Reviews
- BIOSIS Previews
- Cambridge Scientific Abstracts
- Chemical Abstracts Service
- Current Contents/Engineering, Computing & Technology
- EI Compendex Plus
- Inspec
- PASCAL
- Science Citation Index Expanded
- Scopus

According to the Journal Citation Reports, the journal has a 2020 impact factor of 2.413.
