= Ground Operations =

2004 film

Ground Operations: Battlefields to Farmfields
- Produced by: Dulanie Ellis & Raymond Singer
- Music by: Greg Haggard
- Release date: 2004

Ground Operations: Battlefields to Farmfields is a "documentary film and social action campaign that focuses on veterans experiencing PTSD, and the rehabilitation that farming has provided them."

== Plot ==
Ground Operations follows the story of combat veterans who operated in the armed forces, and served in Iraq and Afghanistan. This documentary goes through each individual's story from joining their respective branches, to how the war has changed them personally. It also follows each person's story as they transition to civilian life, and struggle with a highly flawed Department of Veterans Affairs. This leads them all unknowingly to the world of organic farming, which helps them heal from their traumatic emotional scars. The farming serves as a dual purpose to fix a damaged agricultural system, and helps calm the PTSD exacerbated by War Traumas, and the Department of Veterans Affairs.

== Awards ==
Port Townsend Film Festival 2013 "Winner of Social Justice Award" Transformational Film Solutions Award 2013 Cinema Verde Environmental Film Festival 2013" Winner Best Solution" Esalen Social Change Film Festival 2013 "Official Selection" Docutah International Documentary Film Festival 2013 "Audience Favorite"

== See also ==
- Posttraumatic stress disorder
- War in Afghanistan (2001–present)
- Iraq War

== General references ==
- Information on this page was taken from ground operations.net
