= National Atmospheric Research Laboratory =

Indian space research institution

- Former name: National MST Radar Facility
- Type: Research Institution
- Established: 1992; 34 years ago
- Budget: ₹55.34 crore (US$5.8 million) (2025–26)
- Director: Prakash Chauhan
- Location: Tirupati, Andhra Pradesh, India; 13.457°N 79.175°E
- Website: www.narl.gov.in

The National Atmospheric Research Laboratory (NARL) is an autonomous Research Institute funded by the Department of Space of the Government of India. NARL is engaged in fundamental and applied research in the field of Atmospheric Sciences. The research institute was started in 1992 as National Mesosphere-Stratosphere-Troposphere (MST) Radar Facility (NMRF). Over the years many other facilities such as Mie/Rayleigh Lidar, Lower atmospheric wind profiler, optical rain gauge, disdrometer, and automated weather stations were added. The NMRF was then expanded into a research institute and renamed as National Atmospheric Research Laboratory on 22 September 2005.
