= North-Eastern Space Applications Centre =

Indian space research institution

Agency overview
- Abbreviation: NESAC
- Formed: 5 September 2000; 25 years ago
- Type: Space agency
- Headquarters: Umiam, Meghalaya, India
- Motto: Space technology in the service of human kind.
- Administrator: Dr. S. P. Aggarwal, Director
- Annual budget: ₹50 crore (US$5.2 million) (2025–26)
- Website: www.nesac.gov.in

North-Eastern Space Applications Centre (NESAC) is a regional space centre established in September, 2000 by joint initiative of the Department of Space, Government of India and the North Eastern Council to expedite the usage of remote sensing technology to discover natural minerals uncovered in the North-Eastern states of India and to promote overall growth of North Eastern states of India using space science and technology.

== History ==
North-Eastern Space Applications Centre was set up with a joint initiative of the Department of Space and the North Eastern Council in September, 2000 at Shillong in Meghalaya, India. The centre has been declared a protected area by the state government.

== Objectives ==
The objective of NESAC is to search and utilize the natural resources present in the region using remote sensing, provide the North-Eastern states access to satellite services, and promote research in the space technology in the region by tying up with the academic institutions in the region.

== Programmes ==
The centre presently focuses on remote sensing and geographic information systems, a satellite communication programme and space science research programmes

== Facilities ==
The centre is equipped with modern GIS software like Erdas, Geomatica, eCognition, ESRI ArcGIS, and the like. Its equipment includes:

- Digital Photogrammetry Work Stations
- A0 size Colour Scanner
- High Quality printers and plotters
- Leica Differential Global Positioning System (DGPS)
- Visual Interpretation facilities
- Spectroradiometer
- UV-Visible Spectro-photometer, Flame Photometer
- Echo-Sounder
- Plant Canopy Imager

== Projects ==
It has undertaken projects on the land mapping of North-Eastern States on 1:50,000 scale, and wasteland and wetland monitoring. It developed the FLEWS or Flood Early Warning System for the areas which are likely to be the worst affected by floods. It also developed touch input-based information kiosks to provide information about the state of Meghalaya.

== Finances ==
The funding for the centre is divided in 50:50 ratio between the Government of India and the North-Eastern council. The centre has been allocated a budget of Rs. 8 crore for the financial year 2012–13 by the central government.
