= Indian National Centre for Ocean Information Services =

Ocean Information organization in India

Agency overview
- Formed: 1999
- Jurisdiction: Government of India
- Headquarters: Ocean Valley, Pragathi Nagar, Nizampet, Hyderabad, Telangana, India; 17.33466°N 78.60775°E
- Parent agency: Ministry of Earth Sciences
- Website: incois.gov.in

Indian National Center for Ocean Information Services (INCOIS) is an autonomous organization of the Government of India, under the Ministry of Earth Sciences, located in Pragathi Nagar, Hyderabad. ESSO-INCOIS was established as an autonomous body in 1998 under the Ministry of Earth Sciences (MoES) and is a unit of the Earth System Science Organization (ESSO). ESSO- INCOIS is mandated to provide the best possible ocean information and advisory services to society, industry, government agencies and the scientific community through sustained ocean observations and constant improvements through systematic and focussed research.

== History ==
During the 1990s, the Ministry of Earth Sciences, formerly Department of Ocean Development (DOD), had initiated a project titled "PFZ Mission" and it was handed over to National Remote Sensing Centre (NRSC), Hyderabad, AP. The project slowly blossomed into a full-fledged one after being spearheaded by Dr. A. Narendra Nath. As a result of this, the project was separated from NRSC and a new organization was instituted to look after it. The new organization so formed was named as an Indian National Centre for Ocean Information Services (INCOIS) and was placed under reputed scientist Dr A.Narendra Nath, who has also conceptualised INCOIS and was the project lead and founding director. Since its Inception in February 1998. Dr. Narendra Nath is the person who initiated the PFZ Mission. The newly formed entity had potential fishing zone (PFZ) advisories as its major project. Apart from PFZ services, the other services such as Indian Early Tsunami Warning, Ocean State Forecast, Ocean Modeling, Data and Web Services Management were also initiated and their products are being delivered to various stakeholders in the country on a daily basis. In recognition of these services, INCOIS was identified as one of the key International Oceanic Organizations. INCOIS renders its services through its web portal and various other devices that are installed at different places in the country.

== Potential Fishing Zone (PFZ) ==
This is the first advisory service started by INCOIS, with Dr.A.Narendra Nath as the founder director of INCOIS and the project director of PFZ. The backbone of this service is the real-time data for ocean color and SST provided by the OCEANSAT and NOAA respectively. This service was started because there was a need to identify the potential fishing zones to help the fishermen to get better catch while they were at the sea. This service was started by the Ministry of Earth Sciences with the help of the Department of Space and several institutions under the Ministry of Agriculture. These organizations are collaborating with the State Governments of the beneficiary states to offer these services to the end users.

This service makes use of parameters such as sea surface temperature and chlorophyll content provided by NOAA-AVHRR and Oceancolor satellites. Features such as oceanic fronts, Meandering Patterns, Eddies, Rings, Up Welling areas etc. are identified sites for fish accumulation. These features can easily be identified from Sea Surface Temperature and Chlorophyll data. The availability of Chlorophyll from OCEANSAT and MOdDIS has further enriched these advisories in the recent years. Hence, PFZ advisories have helped the fishing community to locate the fishing zones with accuracy.

Another feature of PFZ service is the generation of species-specific advisory to enable the fishermen folk to distinguish between the exploited and under-exploited species in the potential fishing zones. This enables them to have sustainable fishery management by targeting only the under-exploited species in the fishing zones. This approach enables them to avoid fishing the over-exploited species over and over again. One such species-specific advisory is Tuna Fisheries Forecasting System that enables the fishing community to adequately prepare for the Tuna catch. Being a highly migratory fish, it inhabits a wide range of ecosystems and wide area. Hence the fishing of tuna is a costly affair and it requires resource-specific orientation such as long lining by the fishing boats and trawlers. With the help of the parameters such as Oceanic Fronts, water clarity and sea surface temperature we can trace the distribution of tuna species.

== Tsunami Early Warning System (TEWS) ==
In the aftermath of Sumatra earthquake in 2004 and the killer tsunami it set off, the Government of India wanted to set up an early warning centre for tsunami and other storm surges in the Indian Ocean region. Accordingly, on 15 October 2007, a centre housing the Indian Tsunami Early Warning System (TEWS) was established in INCOIS by the Ministry of Earth Sciences, the nodal ministry, with the collaboration of the Department of Science and Technology (DST), Department of Space (DOS), and Council for Scientific and Industrial Research (CSIR). At the time of its establishment, the centre had the mandate to provide important tsunami advisories to the people living in the coastal areas of the country. For this purpose, the center was equipped with state-of-the-art infrastructure and well trained manpower. By 2012, the centre has started to give a round-the-clock alert and advisory services to all Indian Ocean Rim Countries (IOR).

At present, the tsunami warning centre receives data from 17 seismic stations of the Indian Meteorological Department (IMD), 10 stations of the Wadia Institute of Himalayan Geology (WIHG) and more than 300 international stations. In addition, it receives data from 17 sea-level tide gauges at intervals of five minutes. These tide gauges have been positioned at Aerial Bay, Chennai, Ennore, Garden Reach, Haldia, Kandla, Karwar, Krishnapatnam, Marmagao, Machilipatnam, Nagapattinam, Paradeep, Port Blair, Vadinar, Visakhapatnam etc. Apart from sea-level tide sensors, the wave-rider buoys have also been installed at various locations. This network of tide gauges and buoys helps the center to validate the arrivals of tsunami waves in the Indian Ocean region. To further supplement the cause, a network of seismographs has also been installed at appropriate positions to forecast the occurrence of tsunami-producing earthquakes. It has also installed three bottom pressure recorders in different regions to supplement its needs.

Using the data obtained from a network of equipments, models have been run to provide maps depicting inundation scenarios for the entire coastal belt. Based on these scenarios, the potential risk zones are identified to generate advisories for various stakeholders in the region. When there is a disaster, the advisories are generated in intervals telling the location of the storm surges or tsunamis to help the local government authorities to evacuate the people from the regions that are likely to be affected.

== Ocean State Forecast (OSF) ==
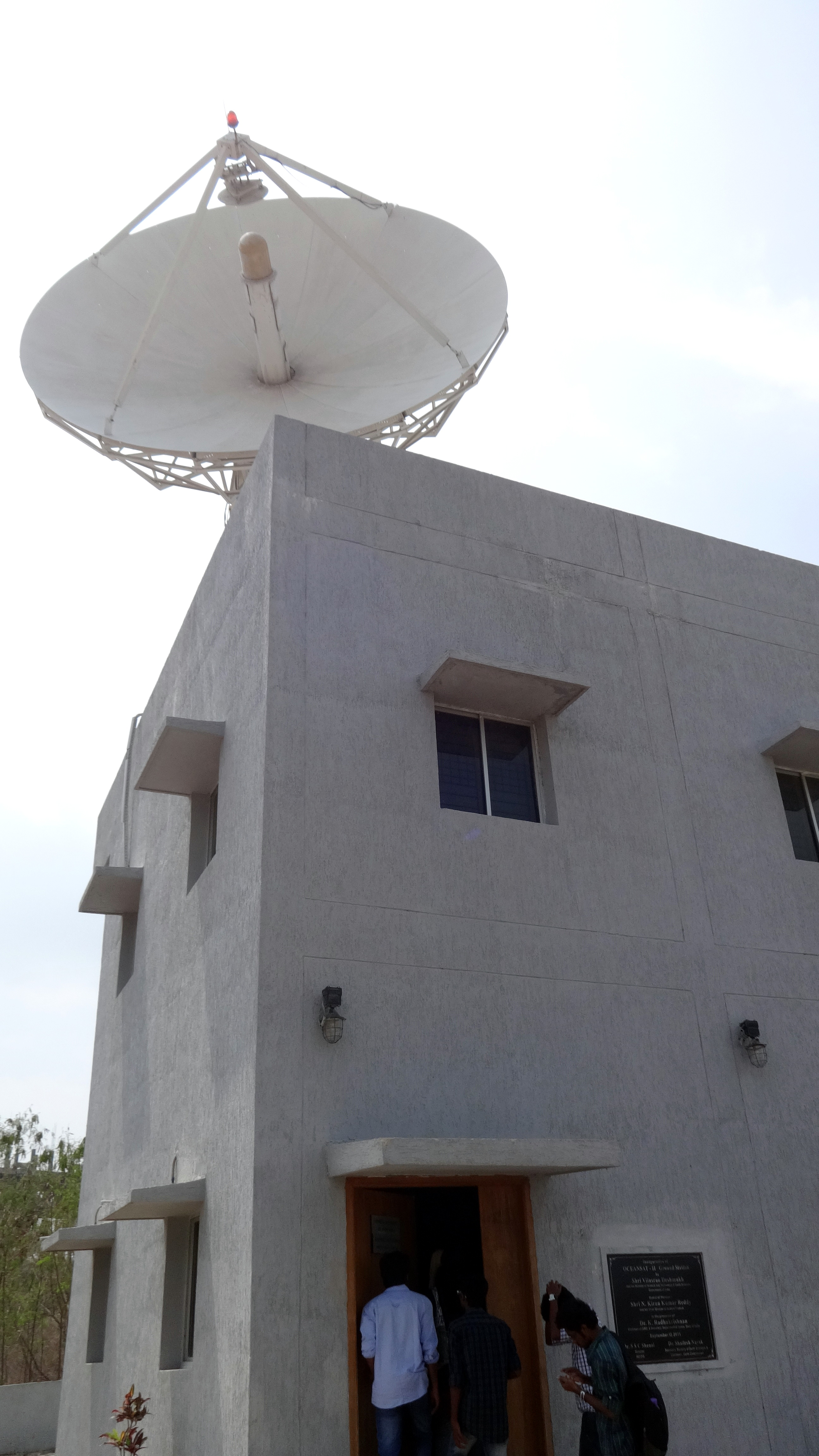
Ground station of OCEANSAT-II, located inside the INCOIS campus

Being a peninsula, India is covered from three sides with water body. Hence there is a need for knowing the state of ocean in advance for carrying out various commercial activities. Prior information about the state of the ocean helps us to plan and execute our activities in the marine environment safely. Moreover, the ocean has an effect on the local climate as well. Thinking about all these factors, a new service was rolled out to forecast the ocean state, which is capable of predicting the surface and sub-surface features of the Indian Ocean in advance. It is called the Indian Ocean Forecasting System (INDOFOS). The forecast is also passed to the stakeholders through Village Information Centers, All India Radio, FM Radio, Digital Display Boards, NGO Websites, and TV channels in the regional languages.

At present, OSF gives forecasts of wave height and direction, sea surface temperature, sea surface currents, mixed layer depth, and depth of 20 degree isotherm. These forecasts are generated by state-of-the art numerical models. These models are customized to simulate and predict the Indian Ocean features realistically. Different models used for forecasts are WAVEWATCH III, WAM, Mike and Regional Ocean Modeling Systems (ROMS). In the forecast mode, these models are forced with atmospheric products developed by various Meteorological agencies to generate different forecasts. Apart from these services, the OSF center also offers value-added services for the benefit of its end users.

The generated forecasts fall under four categories. They are global, regional, location-specific and coastal forecasts. They differ in spatial and temporal resolutions extend of validations. For coastal forecast, the models are set up with the concept of "coarse grid" with coarse resolution in open ocean region whereas very fine resolution is used for location-specific forecasts. These models are tested for their accuracy and reliability by comparing their output with the data from satellite and in-situ measurements. The validation is mainly done during the extreme conditions and monsoon seasons.

== Ocean Observation Group (OOG) ==
The Ocean Observation Group (OOG) at INCOIS is actively involved in measuring and monitoring various oceanic parameters to support oceanographic research and operational forecasting. The group is well-equipped with a range of advanced oceanographic instruments deployed on both stationary (e.g., moored buoys) and mobile platforms (e.g., research vessels and autonomous systems). Recently, INCOIS has implemented the Eddy Covariance Flux Measurement System aboard the research vessel Sagar Nidhi to accurately capture momentum, heat, and moisture fluxes over the ocean. This advanced system enables direct measurements of turbulent fluxes and improves the representation of air–sea interaction processes in weather and climate models.

In addition to these initiatives, INCOIS regularly conducts research cruises in the northern Indian Ocean to investigate key seasonal and interannual phenomena such as monsoon variability, upper-ocean stratification, and mixing processes. The institute has deployed a network of buoys equipped with oceanographic and meteorological sensors to continuously monitor ocean–atmosphere interactions. These high-resolution observations are vital for improving the accuracy of data assimilation in ocean models and enhancing ocean state forecasts and early warning systems. Through these efforts, INCOIS significantly contributes to understanding and predicting oceanic processes in the Indian Ocean region.
