= International Academy of Astronautics =

Independent non-governmental organization

Logo

The International Academy of Astronautics (IAA) is a Paris-based non-government association for the field of astronautics. It was founded in Stockholm, Sweden on August 16, 1960, by Dr. Theodore von Kármán. It was recognised as a non-governmental organization with consultative status for the United Nations in 1996.

The stated purpose of the IAA is:

- Recognize the accomplishments of their peers
- Explore and discuss cutting-edge issues in space research and technology
- Provide direction and guidance in the non-military uses of space and the ongoing exploration of the solar system

Among the activities the academy is involved, there are:

- Organizes annual conferences, symposia, and gatherings covering topics such as space sciences, space life sciences, space technology and system development, space systems operations and utilization, space policy, law, economy, space and society, culture, and education.
- Publishes cosmic studies concerning space exploration, space debris, small satellites, space traffic management, natural disasters, climate change
- Publishes the journal of the International Academy of Astronautics, Acta Astronautica.
- Publishes dictionaries in 24 languages
- Publishies book series on subjects such as small satellites, conference proceedings, remote sensing, and history.

== IAA Mission ==
According to the academy's mission statement, the fundamental purposes of the IAA, are to:

- Foster the development of astronautics for peaceful purposes
- Recognize individuals who have distinguished themselves in a branch of science or technology related to astronautics
- Provide a program through which the membership can contribute to international endeavors
- Promote international cooperation in the advancement of aerospace science.

== Cooperation with other organizations ==
The IAA has established cooperation with the following organizations:

Country	Organization	Since
(Sweden) Royal Swedish Academy of Sciences	Sweden	1985
(Austria) Austrian Academy of Sciences	Austria	1986
(France) French Academy of Sciences	France	1988
(United Kingdom) English Royal Society	United Kingdom	1988
Academy of Finland	Finland	1988
(India) Indian Academy of Sciences	India	1990
(Spain) Royal Spanish Academy of Sciences	Spain	1989
(Germany) German Academy of Sciences	Germany	1990
Kingdom of Netherlands	Netherlands	1990
Royal Society of Canada	Canada	1991
(United States) U.S. National Academy of Sciences	United States	1992
(United States) U.S. National Academy of Engineering	United States	1992
Israel Academy of Sciences and Humanities	Israel	1994
(Norway) Norwegian Academy of Science and Letters	Norway	1995
(China) Chinese Academy of Sciences	China	1996
(Italy) Royal Academy of Sciences of Turin	Italy	1997
(Australia) Australian Academy of Science	Australia	1998
(Australia) Australian Academy of Technological Science and Engineering	Australia	1998
Royal Netherlands Academy of Arts and Sciences	Netherlands	1999
(Brazil) Brazilian Academy of Sciences	Brazil	2000
(United States) U.S. Institute of Medicine	United States	2002
Academy of Sciences of Ukraine	Ukraine	2010
Academy of Sciences of South Africa	South Africa	2011
Royal Society of South Africa	South Africa	2011
(Vatican City) Pontifical Academy of Sciences	Vatican City	2012

== Presidents ==
The academy's first president was Theodore von Kármán. Edward C. Stone held the post of President of the International Academy of Astronautics until October 2009. G. Madhavan Nair, the chairman of the Indian Space Research Organization, was president of the International Academy of Astronautics from August 2009 until 2015. He was the only Indian and the first non-American to head the IAA.

== Journal ==
The IAA sponsors the monthly journal Acta Astronautica, published by Elsevier Press, which "covers developments in space science technology in relation to peaceful scientific exploration of space and its exploitation for human welfare and progress, the conception, design, development and operation of space-borne and Earth-based systems.” In collaboration with the International Astronautical Federation, the IAA launched a review journal, REACH-Reviews in Human Space Exploration, in 2016 that focuses on aspects of human space exploration.
