= Antrix Corporation =

Commercial wing of the Indian Space Research Organization

Antrix Corporation Limited
- Type: Public Sector Undertaking
- Industry: Aerospace; Communications
- Founded: 28 September 1992; 33 years ago
- Headquarters: Antariksh Bhavan Campus, Near New BEL Road, Bangalore, Karnataka, India
- Key people: Sanjay Kumar Agarwal (CMD)
- Services: Transponder provisioning; Satellite launch; Remote sensing; Spacecraft and Subsystems; Mission Support; Ground Infrastructure for Space based Needs
- Revenue: ▼₹65,438.12 lakh (US$68 million) (2020–21)
- Operating income: ▼₹7,898.08 lakh (US$8.2 million) (2020–21)
- Net income: ▼₹5,571.12 lakh (US$5.8 million) (2020–21)
- Total assets: ▼₹190,556.18 lakh (US$200 million) (2020–21)
- Total equity: ▼₹156,731.45 lakh (US$160 million) (2020–21)
- Owner: Department of Space
- Website: www.antrix.co.in

Antrix Corporation Limited (ISO 15919: Ēnṭriks) is a state-owned Indian aerospace company, headquartered in Bengaluru, Karnataka, under the administrative control of the Department of Space (DoS). It was incorporated in September 1992, as a commercial and marketing arm of ISRO by prompting, commercially delivering and marketing products and services emanating from ISRO. It provides major technical consultancy services and transfers technologies to industry.

== History ==
Antrix Corporation was incorporated on 28 September 1992 as a private limited company owned by the Indian government. Its objective is to promote the ISRO's products, services and technologies. The company is a Public Sector Undertaking (PSU), wholly owned by the Government of India. It is administered by the DoS.

It had dealings with EADS Astrium, Intelsat, Avanti Group, WorldSpace, Inmarsat, SES World Skies, Measat, Singtel and other space institutions in Europe, Middle East and South East Asia.

It was awarded 'Miniratna Category-I' status by the government in 2008.

== Achievements ==
- Successful launch of W2M satellite for Eutelsat.
- Successful supply of reliable satellite systems and sub-systems. Some of Antrix's better known customers are Hughes, Matra Marconi, World Space etc.
- Successful Commercial Satellite Launches of SPOT 687 (France), Pathfinder & Dove (U.S), Tecsar (Israel), Kitsat (South Korea), Tubsat (DLR – Germany), BIRD (DLR – Germany), PROBA (Verhaert, Belgium) aboard the ISRO's Polar Satellite Launch Vehicle (PSLV).
- Execution of many IOT / TTC support services to International Space Agencies. Some of the customers used Antrix services are World Space, PanAmSat, GE, Americom, AFRISAT etc.

== Business agreement ==
On 29 January 2014, Antrix Corporation Limited (Antrix), the commercial arm of Indian Space Research Organization (ISRO), signed a Launch Services Agreement with DMC International Imaging (DMCii), the wholly owned subsidiary of Surrey Satellite Technology Limited (SSTL), United Kingdom (UK), for the launch of three DMC-3 Earth Observation Satellites being built by SSTL, on board ISRO's Polar Satellite Launch Vehicle (PSLV).

On 5 February 2014, Antrix signed another Launch Services Agreement with ST Electronics (Satcom & Sensor Systems) Pte Ltd, Singapore, for the launch of TeLEOS-1 Earth Observation Satellite, on-board PSLV. These launches are planned from the end of 2014 to the end of 2015. On 29 September 2014, Canada announced that it has decided to give the contract of the July 2015 launch of its M3M (Maritime Monitoring and Messaging Micro-Satellite) communications satellite to Antrix during the inauguration of the International Astronautical Congress at Toronto.

== Satellite launches ==
As of February 2022 ISRO has launched 343 foreign satellites for 36 countries. All satellites were launched using the ISRO's PSLV expendable launch system. Between 2013 and 2015, India launched 28 foreign satellites for 13 countries, earning a total revenue of US$101 million.

Antrix launched 239 satellites between 2016 and 2019 earning a total revenue of ₹6,289 crore (US$650 million).

== Controversies ==
=== S-band spectrum scam ===
In January 2005, Antrix Corporation signed an agreement with Devas Multimedia (a private company formed by former ISRO employees and Venture Capitalists from USA) for lease of S band transponders on two ISRO satellites (GSAT 6 and GSAT 6A) for a price of ₹14 billion (US$150 million), a huge amount lower than market price, to be paid over a period of 12 years. Devas shares were sold at a premium of ₹1,226,000 (US$13,000), taking the accumulated share premium to ₹5.78 billion (US$60 million), thus getting a high profit. In July 2008, Devas offloaded 17% of its stake to German company Deutsche Telekom for US$75 million, and by 2010 had 17 investors, including former ISRO scientists.

In late 2009, some ISRO insiders exposed information about the Devas-Antrix deal, and the ensuing investigations resulted in the deal being annulled. G. Madhavan Nair (ISRO Chairperson when the agreement was signed) was barred from holding any post under the Department of Space. Some former scientists were found guilty of "acts of commission" or "acts of omission". Devas and Deutsche Telekom demanded US$2 billion and US$1 billion, respectively, in damages.

The Central Bureau of Investigation concluded investigations into the Antrix-Devas scam and registered a case against the accused in the Antrix-Devas deal under Section 120-B, besides Section 420 of IPC and Section 13(2) read with 13(1)(d) of PC Act, 1988 on 18 March 2015 against the then executive director, Antrix Corporation Limited, Bengaluru; two officials of USA-based company; Bengaluru based private multi media company and other unknown officials of Antrix Corporation Limited /ISRO/Department of Space.
