= Department of Space =

Indian government space program administrator

- अंतरिक्ष विभाग; Antarikṣ Vibhāg
- Emblem of India

Department overview
- Jurisdiction: Government of India
- Headquarters: Antariksh Bhavan, Bengaluru, Karnataka, India
- Annual budget: ₹13,705.63 crore (US$1.4 billion) (2026–27)
- Minister responsible: Narendra Modi, Prime Minister
- Deputy Minister responsible: Jitendra Singh; Minister of State in the Department of Space
- Department executive: V. Narayanan, Secretary of Space and Chairman of the Indian Space Research Organisation
- Child agencies: Indian Space Research Organisation (ISRO); Physical Research Laboratory (PRL); Indian National Space Promotion and Authorisation Centre (IN-SPACe); NewSpace India Limited (NSIL); National Atmospheric Research Laboratory (NARL); North-Eastern Space Applications Centre (NESAC); Antrix Corporation
- Website: www.isro.gov.in

Map
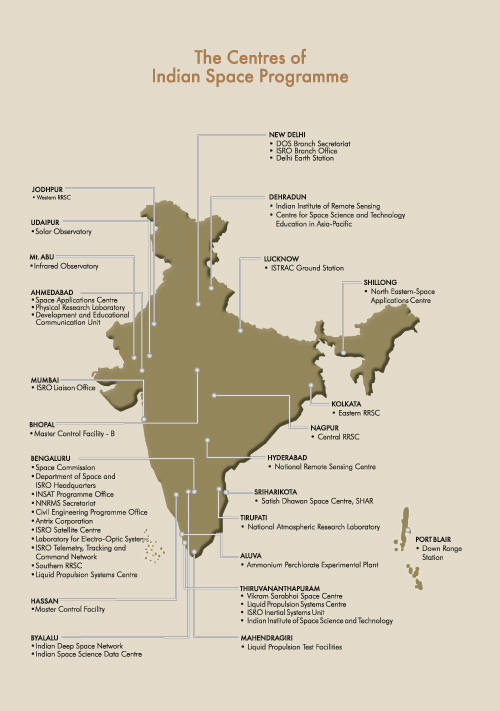
- Map of centres of the Department of Space of the Government of India

The Department of Space (DoS) is an Indian government department responsible for administration of the Indian space programme. It manages several agencies and institutes related to space exploration and space technologies. The Indian space programme under the DoS aims to promote the development and application of space science and technology for the socio-economic benefit of the country. It includes two major satellite systems, Indian National Satellite System (INSAT) for communication, television broadcasting and meteorological services, and Indian Remote Sensing Satellites (IRS) for resources monitoring and management. It has also developed two satellite launch vehicles, the Polar Satellite Launch Vehicle (PSLV) and the Geosynchronous Satellite Launch Vehicle (GSLV) to place IRS and INSAT class satellites in orbit.

== History ==
In 1961, the Government of India and then Prime Minister Jawaharlal Nehru entrusted the responsibility for space research and for the peaceful use of outer space to the Department of Atomic Energy (DAE), then under the leadership of Homi J. Bhabha. In 1962, the Department of Atomic Energy set up Indian National Committee for Space Research (INCOSPAR), with Vikram Sarabhai as chairman, to organise a national space programme.

In 1969, INCOSPAR was reconstituted as an advisory body under the India National Science Academy (INSA) and the Indian Space Research Organisation (ISRO) was established. The Government of India constituted the Space Commission and established the Department of Space (DoS) in 1972 and brought ISRO under DoS management on 1 June 1972.

On 14 January 2025, V. Narayanan succeeded S. Somanath as the Secretary (Space) and ex-officio chairman of Indian Space Research Organisation and Space Commission.

== Agencies and institutes ==
Organisation chart showing structure of the Department of Space

The Department of Space manages the following agencies and institutes:

- Indian Space Research Organisation (ISRO) – The primary research and development arm of the DoS
  - Vikram Sarabhai Space Centre (VSSC), Thiruvananthapuram
  - Liquid Propulsion Systems Centre (LPSC), Thiruvananthapuram
  - Satish Dhawan Space Centre (SDSC-SHAR), Sriharikota
  - U R Rao Satellite Centre (URSC), Bengaluru
  - Space Applications Centre (SAC), Ahmedabad
  - SSLV Launch Complex (SLC), Kulasekarapattinam
  - Thumba Equatorial Rocket Launching Station (TERLS), Thiruvananthapuram
  - National Remote Sensing Centre (NRSC), Hyderabad
  - ISRO Inertial Systems Unit (IISU), Thiruvananthapuram
  - Development and Educational Communication Unit (DECU), Ahmedabad
  - Master Control Facility (MCF), Hassan
  - ISRO Telemetry, Tracking and Command Network (ISTRAC), Bengaluru
  - Laboratory for Electro-Optics Systems (LEOS), Bengaluru
  - Indian Institute of Remote Sensing (IIRS), Dehradun
- Antrix Corporation, Bengaluru – The marketing arm of ISRO
- Physical Research Laboratory (PRL), Ahmedabad
- National Atmospheric Research Laboratory (NARL), Gadanki
- North-Eastern Space Applications Centre (NESAC), Umiam
- Indian Institute of Space Science and Technology (IIST), Thiruvananthapuram – India's space science and technology university
- NewSpace India Limited (NSIL), Bengaluru
- Indian National Space Promotion and Authorisation Centre (IN–SPACe), Ahmedabad

== Historical list of annual budget of department of space ==
Budget of Department of Space through time

Annual Budget of Department of Space from 1972 to 1999
| Year | Department of Space Budget (crore ₹) | Department of Space Budget (in 2023 constant INR) |
|---|---|---|
| 1972–73 | 18.2325000 | 819.764 |
| 1973–74 | 19.0922000 | 734.893 |
| 1974–75 | 30.7287000 | 920.293 |
| 1975–76 | 36.8379000 | 1,034.909 |
| 1976–77 | 41.1400000 | 1,250.173 |
| 1977–78 | 37.3670000 | 1,048.38 |
| 1978–79 | 51.4518000 | 1,408.028 |
| 1979–80 | 57.0062000 | 1,468.375 |
| 1980–81 | 82.1087000 | 1,898.797 |
| 1981–82 | 109.132100 | 2,231.643 |
| 1982–83 | 94.8898000 | 1,797.751 |
| 1983–84 | 163.365600 | 2,767.55 |
| 1984–85 | 181.601000 | 2,837.197 |
| 1985–86 | 229.102300 | 3,391.279 |
| 1986–87 | 309.990900 | 4,220.286 |
| 1987–88 | 347.084600 | 4,343.593 |
| 1988–89 | 422.367000 | 4,831.886 |
| 1989–90 | 398.559500 | 4,257.157 |
| 1990–91 | 386.221800 | 3,787.304 |
| 1991–92 | 460.101000 | 3,962.043 |
| 1992–93 | 490.920400 | 3,778.456 |
| 1993–94 | 695.335000 | 5,034.199 |
| 1994–95 | 759.079300 | 4,987.831 |
| 1995–96 | 755.778596 | 4,503.218 |
| 1996–97 | 1,062.44660 | 5,808.958 |
| 1997–98 | 1,050.50250 | 5,355.404 |
| 1998–99 | 1,401.70260 | 6,314.116 |
| 1999–2000 | 1,677.38580 | 7,207.213 |

Annual Budget of Department of Space from 2000s
| Year | Department of Space Budget (crore ₹) | Department of Space Budget (in 2023 constant INR) |
|---|---|---|
| 2000–01 | 1,905.39970 | 7,870.388 |
| 2001–02 | 1,900.97370 | 7,566.941 |
| 2002–03 | 2,162.22480 | 8,251.252 |
| 2003–04 | 2,268.80470 | 8,340.184 |
| 2004–05 | 2,534.34860 | 8,978.048 |
| 2005–06 | 2,667.60440 | 9,064.742 |
| 2006–07 | 2,988.66550 | 9,600 |
| 2007–08 | 3,278.00440 | 9,896.958 |
| 2008–09 | 3,493.57150 | 9,737.543 |
| 2009–10 | 4,162.95990 | 10,469.328 |
| 2010–11 | 4,482.23150 | 10,054.831 |
| 2011–12 | 3,790.78880 | 7,810.892 |
| 2012–13 | 4,856.28390 | 9,154.92 |
| 2013–14 | 5,168.95140 | 8,785.089 |
| 2014–15 | 5,821.36630 | 9,301.439 |
| 2015–16 | 6,920.00520 | 10,442.867 |
| 2016–17 | 8,039.99680 | 11,558.692 |
| 2017–18 | 9,130.56640 | 12,807.642 |
| 2018–19 | 11,192.6566 | 14,973.994 |
| 2019–20 | 13,033.2917 | 16,196.004 |
| 2020–21 | 9,490.05390 | 11,169.744 |
| 2021–22 | 12,473.84 | 13,997.153 |
| 2022–23 | 10,158.4694 | 10,764.009 |
| 2023–24 | 10,704.07 | 10,704.07 |

Budget of Department of Space as percentage of Indian GDP

Department of Space budget as percentage of Total Expenditure

| Calendar Year | GDP (2011-12 base year) in crores(₹) | Total Expenditure in crores (₹) | Budget of Department of Space | | | | Notes and references |
| Calendar Year | GDP (2011-12 base year) in crores(₹) | Total Expenditure in crores (₹) | Nominal INR (crore) | % of GDP | % of total expenditure | 2023 Constant INR (crore) | Notes and references |
|---|---|---|---|---|---|---|---|
| 1972-73 | 55245 | | 18.2325000 | 0.03% | | 819.764 | Revised Estimate as Actuals are not available |
| 1973-74 | 67241 | | 19.0922000 | 0.03% | | 734.893 | Revised Estimate as Actuals are not available |
| 1974-75 | 79378 | | 30.7287000 | 0.04% | | 920.293 | |
| 1975-76 | 85212 | | 36.8379000 | 0.04% | | 1,034.909 | |
| 1976-77 | 91812 | | 41.1400000 | 0.04% | | 1,250.173 | Revised Estimate as Actuals are not available |
| 1977-78 | 104024 | | 37.3670000 | 0.04% | | 1,048.38 | |
| 1978-79 | 112671 | | 51.4518000 | 0.05% | | 1,408.028 | |
| 1979-80 | 123562 | | 57.0062000 | 0.05% | | 1,468.375 | |
| 1980-81 | 147063 | | 82.1087000 | 0.06% | | 1,898.797 | |
| 1981-82 | 172776 | | 109.132100 | 0.06% | | 2,231.643 | Revised Estimate as Actuals are not available |
| 1982-83 | 193255 | | 94.8898000 | 0.05% | | 1,797.751 | |
| 1983-84 | 225074 | | 163.365600 | 0.07% | | 2,767.55 | |
| 1984-85 | 252188 | | 181.601000 | 0.07% | | 2,837.197 | |
| 1985-86 | 284534 | | 229.102300 | 0.08% | | 3,391.279 | |
| 1986-87 | 318366 | | 309.990900 | 0.1% | | 4,220.286 | |
| 1987-88 | 361865 | | 347.084600 | 0.1% | | 4,343.593 | |
| 1988-89 | 429363 | | 422.367000 | 0.1% | | 4,831.886 | |
| 1989-90 | 493278 | | 398.559500 | 0.08% | | 4,257.157 | |
| 1990-91 | 576109 | 105298 | 386.221800 | 0.07% | 0.37% | 3,787.304 | |
| 1991-92 | 662260 | 111414 | 460.101000 | 0.07% | 0.41% | 3,962.043 | |
| 1992-93 | 761196 | 122618 | 490.920400 | 0.06% | 0.4% | 3,778.456 | |
| 1993-94 | 875992 | 141853 | 695.335000 | 0.08% | 0.49% | 5,034.199 | |
| 1994-95 | 1027570 | 160739 | 759.079300 | 0.07% | 0.47% | 4,987.831 | |
| 1995-96 | 1205583 | 178275 | 755.778596 | 0.06% | 0.42% | 4,503.218 | |
| 1996-97 | 1394816 | 201007 | 1062.44660 | 0.08% | 0.53% | 5,808.958 | |
| 1997-98 | 1545294 | 232053 | 1050.50250 | 0.07% | 0.45% | 5,355.404 | |
| 1998-99 | 1772297 | 279340 | 1401.70260 | 0.08% | 0.5% | 6,314.116 | |
| 1999-2000 | 1988262 | 298053 | 1677.38580 | 0.08% | 0.56% | 7,207.213 | |
| 2000-01 | 2139886 | 325592 | 1905.39970 | 0.09% | 0.59% | 7,870.388 | |
| 2001-02 | 2315243 | 362310 | 1900.97370 | 0.08% | 0.52% | 7,566.941 | |
| 2002-03 | 2492614 | 413248 | 2162.22480 | 0.09% | 0.52% | 8,251.252 | |
| 2003-04 | 2792530 | 471203 | 2268.80470 | 0.08% | 0.48% | 8,340.184 | |
| 2004-05 | 3186332 | 498252 | 2534.34860 | 0.08% | 0.51% | 8,978.048 | |
| 2005-06 | 3632125 | 505738 | 2667.60440 | 0.07% | 0.53% | 9,064.742 | |
| 2006-07 | 4254629 | 583387 | 2988.66550 | 0.07% | 0.51% | 9,600 | |
| 2007-08 | 4898662 | 712671 | 3278.00440 | 0.07% | 0.46% | 9,896.958 | |
| 2008-09 | 5514152 | 883956 | 3493.57150 | 0.06% | 0.4% | 9,737.543 | |
| 2009-10 | 6366407 | 1024487 | 4162.95990 | 0.07% | 0.41% | 10,469.328 | |
| 2010-11 | 7634472 | 1197328 | 4482.23150 | 0.06% | 0.37% | 10,054.831 | |
| 2011-12 | 8736329 | 1304365 | 3790.78880 | 0.04% | 0.29% | 7,810.892 | |
| 2012-13 | 9944013 | 1410372 | 4856.28390 | 0.05% | 0.34% | 9,154.92 | |
| 2013-14 | 11233522 | 1559447 | 5168.95140 | 0.05% | 0.33% | 8,785.089 | |
| 2014-15 | 12467960 | 1663673 | 5821.36630 | 0.05% | 0.35% | 9,301.439 | |
| 2015-16 | 13771874 | 1790783 | 6920.00520 | 0.05% | 0.39% | 10,442.867 | |
| 2016-17 | 15391669 | 1975194 | 8039.99680 | 0.05% | 0.41% | 11,558.692 | |
| 2017-18 | 17090042 | 2141975 | 9130.56640 | 0.05% | 0.43% | 12,807.642 | |
| 2018-19 | 18899668 | 2315113 | 11192.6566 | 0.06% | 0.48% | 14,973.994 | |
| 2019-20 | 20103593 | 2686330 | 13033.2917 | 0.06% | 0.49% | 16,196.004 | |
| 2020-21 | 19854096 | 3509836 | 9490.05390 | 0.05% | 0.27% | 11,169.744 | |
| 2021-22 | 23597399 | 3793801 | 12473.84 | 0.05% | 0.33% | 13,997.153 | |
| 2022-23 | 26949646 | 4193157 | 10158.4694 | 0.04% | 0.24% | 10,764.009 | |
| 2023-24 | 29535667 | 4443447 | 10704.07 | 0.04% | 0.24% | 10,704.07 | |

== See also ==
- Budget of NASA
