= National Remote Sensing Centre =

Developed and Maintaining by Indian Space Research Organisation

- राष्ट्रीय सुदूर संवेदन केन्द्र

Agency overview
- Formed: 21 November 1963; 62 years ago
- Jurisdiction: Department of Space
- Headquarters: Hyderabad, India; 17°28′4.22″N 78°26′58″E
- Annual budget: See the budget of ISRO
- Agency executive: Prakash Chauhan, Director
- Parent agency: ISRO
- Website: ISRO NRSC home page

National Remote Sensing Centre (Hindi: राष्ट्रीय सुदूर संवेदन केन्द्र), or NRSC, located in Hyderabad, Telangana is one of the centres of ISRO. NRSC manages data from aerial and satellite sources.

== Finances ==
NRSC is mostly financed by State and Central Government India funds but also do commercial business by selling satellite images and provide Consultancy to various government, private organisations. According to RTI number: NRESC/R/E/20/00021, revenues and grants values are published for 2014 to 2019 year.

In 2025 Government of India announced ₹ 1,706.79 crore, for supporting centers.

Year Wise Revenue Breakup for NRSC
| S.No | Financial Year | Revenue from Sale of Satellite data (in INR Lakhs) | Revenue from Consultancy Services (in INR Lakhs) | Funds given by State and Central Governments (in INR Lakhs) | Revenue from Patents (in INR Lakhs) |
|---|---|---|---|---|---|
| 1 | 2014–2015 | 2085.21 | 670.83 | 29069.43 | - |
| 2 | 2015–2016 | 3069.84 | 191.99 | 37366.81 | - |
| 3 | 2016–2017 | 1007.49 | 838.77 | 38109.31 | - |
| 4 | 2017–2018 | 1417.69 | 1571.75 | 47271.95 | - |
| 5 | 2018–2019 | 1643.91 | 4872.03 | 49437.40 | - |
