= List of IIT Madras people =

This is a list of notable alumni of the Indian Institute of Technology Madras.

== Academia ==
=== Deans, directors, and presidents ===
Name	Class year	Notability	References
Timothy A. Gonsalves	BTech 1976	1st director of Indian Institute of Technology Mandi	
Ramayya Krishnan		Dean of the Heinz College at Carnegie Mellon University	
Shashi Nambisan	BTech 1984	Professor of Civil Engineering at University of Tennessee Knoxville; ex-Director of the Center for Transportation Research and Education at Iowa State University)	
Gangan Pratap	BTech 1974; PhD 1978	Former director National Institute of Science Communication and Information Resources; honorary professor, APJ Abdul Kalam Technological University; IIT Madras Distinguished Alumnus Award—1999	
Bhaskar Ramamurthi	BTech 1980	Professor of Electrical Engineering; Director of the Institute at IIT Madras; Doyens of Madras	
Govindan Sundararajan	BTech 1976	Former director, International Advanced Research Centre for Powder Metallurgy and New Materials (ARCI); Shanti Swarup Bhatnagar Prize for Science and Technology—1994; Padma Shri	
B. N. Suresh	MTech 1969	Founder Director (2007–2010) Indian Institute of Space Science and Technology; Padma Bhushan—2013; Padma Shri—2002; IIT Madras Distinguished Alumnus Award—2004	
Subra Suresh	BTech 1977	President of Carnegie Mellon University; former director of the National Science Foundation; former Dean of Engineering at MIT	

=== Professors and scholars ===
Name	Class year	Notability	References
Arumugam Manthiram	PhD 1980	Professor of Mechanical Engineering at University of Texas at Austin; Inventor of polyanion cathodes for lithium ion batteries; Delivered the 2019 Nobel Prize Lecture in Chemistry; IIT Madras Distinguished Alumnus Award - 2015	
Anant Agarwal	BTech 1982	Professor of Electrical Engineering and Computer Science at MIT; CEO of EdX; holds a Guinness World Record for the largest microphone array; IIT Madras Distinguished Alumnus Award – 2014	
Animashree Anandkumar	BTech 2004	Bren Professor of Computing at California Institute of Technology; director of machine learning research at NVIDIA	
G. K. Ananthasuresh	BTech 1989	Professor at Department of Mechanical Engineering, Indian Institute of Science, Bengaluru; Shanti Swarup Bhatnagar Prize for Science and Technology	
Hari Balakrishnan	BTech 1993	Fujitsu Professor of Electrical Engineering and Computer Science at MIT; ACM SIGCOMM Test of Time Award—2011; ACM SIGMOBILE Test of Time Award—2017, 2018; ACM SIGOPS Hall of Fame Award—2015; ACM SIGMOD Test of Time Award—2017; 2020 Infosys Prize; 2021 IEEE Koji Kobayashi Award for Computers and Communications; Member of the National Academy of Engineering; Member of the American Academy of Arts and Sciences	
Dipankar Banerjee	BTech 1974	Professor in the Department of Materials Engineering Engineering of the Indian Institute of Science	
Narayanan Chandrakumar	MSc 1972	Chemical Physicist; Professor of Chemistry, Indian Institute of Technology Madras; Shanti Swarup Bhatnagar Prize for Science and Technology—1996; J. C. Bose National Fellowship—2009	
K. Mani Chandy	BTech 1965	Simon Ramo Professor of Computer Science at the California Institute of Technology; A. A. Michelson Award of CMG (the Computer Measurement Group); Sherman Fairchild Fellowship; IEEE Koji Kobayashi Award for Computers and Communications; Fellow of the IEEE; Member of the National Academy of Engineering; 2014 Dijkstra Prize	
Atul Chokshi	BTech 1980	Professor, Materials Engineering, Indian Institute of Science Bangalore; Swarnajayanti Presidential Young Investigator Award; MRSI Medal; Metallurgist of the Year Award (Ministry of Steel & Mines); Shanti Swarup Bhatnagar Award, G.D. Birla Gold Medal (IIM); IIT Madras Distinguished Alumnus Award	
S. A. Choudum	PhD 1974	Professor at the Department of Mathematics, Indian Institute of Technology Madras	
Premkumar Devanbu	B.Tech 1977	Distinguished Professor Emeritus of Computer Science, University of California, Davis; ACM SIGSOFT Outstanding Research Award; Alexander von Humboldt Research Award; IEEE Computer Society Harlan Mills Award	
Venkatesan Guruswami	BTech 1997	Associate Professor at the Department of Computer Science, Carnegie Mellon University; ex-faculty at University of Washington	
Viswanathan Kumaran	BTech 1987	Professor, Indian Institute of Science	
L. Mahadevan	BTech 1986	de Valpine Professor of Applied Mathematics, Physics and Biology, Harvard University; MacArthur Fellow 2009; F.R.S. 2016	
Pinaki Majumdar	MTech 1990	Professor at Harish-Chandra Research Institute; Shanti Swarup Bhatnagar Prize for Science and Technology—2007	
Pranawachandra Deshmukh	PhD 1979	Adjunct professor of physics at Indian Institute of Technology Tirupati; mentor and convener, CAMOST, a joint initiative of Indian Institute of Technology Tirupati and Indian Institute of Science Education and Research Tirupati (since 2020)	
C. G. Krishnadas Nair	BTech 1964	Author; Metallurgist; Padma Shri Laureate; IIT Madras Distinguished Alumnus Award—1996	
Ramarathnam Narasimhan	BTech 1982	Professor, Department of Mechanical Engineering at the Indian Institute of Science; IIT Madras Distinguished Alumni Award – 2016	
Arvind Narayanan	BTech 2004	Assistant Professor of Computer Science at Princeton University; PET Award for Outstanding Research in Privacy Enhancing Technology—2014	
Sethuraman Panchanathan	MTech 1986	Executive Vice President at ASU Knowledge Enterprise Development; Chief Research and Innovation Officer at Arizona State University (ASU)	
Shanthi Pavan	BTech 1995	Professor, Department of Electrical Engineering, IIT Madras	
A. G. Ramakrishnan	MTech 1982; PhD 1989	Professor at Department of Electrical Engineering, Indian Institute of Science, Bengaluru; Member, Karnataka Knowledge Commission, Senate Member, IIIT Allahabad; Manthan Awards 2014 and 2015; Founder-director of RaGaVeRa Indic Technologies Pvt Ltd.	
B.S. Sathyaprakash	MSc Phys. 1981	Bert Elsbach Professor of Physics The Pennsylvania State University; Professor of Gravitational Physics Cardiff University; Associate, International Centre for Theoretical Sciences, Bangalore, India; Sathyaprakash Research Group	
Mahadev Satyanarayanan		Carnegie Group Professor of Computer Science at Carnegie Mellon University; Principal architect and implementor of the Andrew File System (AFS)	
V. Srinivasan	BTech 1966	The Adams Distinguished Professor of Management, Emeritus, Stanford University; IIT Madras Distinguished Alumnus Award—2001	
Marti G. Subrahmanyam		Charles E. Merrill Professor of Finance at the Stern School of Business at New York University	
Arun Sundararajan		Professor at Stern School of Business, New York University	
Rusi Taleyarkhan	BTech 1977	Professor, Nuclear Engineering, Purdue University, West Lafayette, Indiana	
Sridhar Tayur		Ford Distinguished Research Chair and Professor of Operations Management at the Tepper School of Business, Carnegie Mellon University; founder, SmartOps and OrganJet	
Jayant B. Udgaonkar	MSc 1981	Senior Professor, National Centre for Biological Sciences, Tata Institute of Fundamental Research; J. C. Bose National fellow; Shanti Swarup Bhatnagar Prize for Biological Sciences – 2000; IIT Madras Distinguished Alumnus Award – 2011; G. N. Ramachandran Gold Medal – 2011	
Karthik Sarma	BTech 1996	Founder and Managing Partner, SRS Investment Management, USA	
Sujatha Srinivasan	PhD 2007	Professor in the department of mechanical engineering and heads the National Center for Assistive Health Technologies and the Rehabilitation Research and Device Development	
Vidhya Srinivasan	BTech 2000	Vice President and General Manager, Google Search Advertising and Experiences Google USA	
Shuba Kumar	BTech 1994	Managing Director, Natesan Synchrones Pvt. Ltd. INDIA	
Nagaraja Rao Harshadeep	BTech 1988	Global Lead, World Bank USA	
Bob Balaram	BTech 1980	Chief Engineer, Mars Helicopter Project, Jet Propulsion Laboratory, NASA USA	
Chakrapani. R. V	BTech 1984	Managing Director, Aarvee Associates INDIA	

== Arts and entertainment ==
Name	Class year	Notability	References
R. Prasanna		Guitarist; Life Time Achievement Award, 2003 from Shankaracharya Shri. Jayendra Saraswathi swamigal of the Kanchi Kamakoti Peetham	
S. Sowmya	MSc 1992	Carnatic music singer; Sangita Kalanidhi Award—2019	

== Humanities and social sciences ==
Name	Class year	Notability	References
Nirmalananda Swamiji	MTech 1996	Head of Adichunchanagiri Hills Math	
Sant Rajinder Singh Ji Maharaj	BTech 1967	Spiritual leader at Science of Spirituality; retired from Bell Labs in 1989	
Balaji Sampath	BTech 1994	Founder and Secretary of NGO Association for India's Development India Chapter	

== Industry ==
Name	Class year	Notability	References
T. K. Alex	MTech 1971	Director at ISRO Satellite Centre, Bangalore, 2008–2012	
B. Jayant Baliga	BTech 1969; DSc (Honoris Causea) 2016	Inventor of the Insulated-Gate Bipolar Transistor; National Medal of Technology and Innovation Award—2010; IEEE Medal of Honor—2014; IIT Madras Distinguished Alumnus Award—1999	
Krishna Bharat		Creator of Google News; principal scientist, Google	
Gururaj Deshpande	BTech 1973	Founder of Sycamore Networks; chairman at Tejas Networks; Distinguished Alumnus Awardee from IIT Madras in 1998	
Kris Gopalakrishnan	MSc 1977; MTech 1979	Padma Bhushan Laureate; co-founder of Infosys; President of Confederation of Indian Industry; IIT Madras Distinguished Alumnus Award—1998	
Ramanathan V. Guha		Inventor of RSS feed technology; computer scientist at Google; won the Distinguished Alumnus award from IIT Madras in 2013	
Vic Gundotra		Ex-Senior Vice President, Social for Google; widely believed to be the mastermind behind Google Plus; previously worked at Microsoft	
Venky Harinarayan	BTech 1988	Kosmix co-founder; won the Distinguished Alumnus award from IIT Madras in 2013	
Jai Menon		IBM Fellow; CTO and VP, Technical Strategy, IBM Systems and Technology Group; significant contributor to RAID technology; awarded Distinguished Alumnus award by IIT Madras in 2006	
C. Mohan	BTech 1977	IBM Fellow at IBM Almaden Research Center and Former IBM India Chief Scientist; famous for his work on Database systems and in particular the ARIES technology; awarded Distinguished Alumnus award by IIT Madras in 2003	
B Muthuraman	BTech 1966	Managing Director of Tata Steel; Padma Bhushan Laureate; IIT Madras Distinguished Alumnus Award—1997	
Prabhakar Raghavan		Vice President of Engineering at Google; former head of Yahoo! Labs	
Anand Rajaraman		Founder of Junglee and Kosmix.com with Venky Harinarayan; won the Distinguished Alumnus award from IIT Madras in 2013	
Raghu Ramakrishnan		Technical Fellow at Microsoft; former vice-president and research fellow at Yahoo! Research; professor of computer science at the University of Wisconsin Madison; won the Distinguished Alumnus award from IIT Madras in 2007	
Venkat Rangan	BTech 1981	Co-founder and CTO at Clearwell Systems; served as Professor of Computer Science at University of California, San Diego	
P. S. Veeraraghavan	MTech 1971	Director at Vikram Sarabhai Space Centre, Trivandrum, 2008–2012; distinguished scientist at ISRO and Director, ISRO Inertial Systems Unit	
Prem Watsa	BTech 1971	Founder, chairman, and chief executive officer of Fairfax Financial Holdings, Toronto, Canada; Member of the Order of Canada; IIT Madras Distinguished Alumnus Award—1999	
Umesh Subramanian	BTech 1993	CTO of Citadel Securities (2018-Present); CTO of Goldman Sachs (2014-2018)	
Sridhar Ramaswamy	BTech 1989	CEO of Snowflake (2024 - Present)	
Aravind Srinivas	BTech 2017	CEO of Perplexity AI (2022 - Present)	
Vineeta Singh	BTech 2005	CEO of Sugar Cosmetics (2015 - Present)	
Sridhar Vembu	BTech 1989	Co-Founder and former CEO of Zoho Corporation	
Krishna Bharat	BTech 1991	Distinguished Research Scientist at Google.	
Dr. S. Somanath	Ph. D 2024	Chairman, Indian Space Research Organization.	
Jaishree Deshpande	MS 1975	Trustee and Founder of Deshpande Foundation.	
Ramesh Srinivasan	BTech 1992	Senior Partner, Mckinsey & Co, USA.	
Kamesh Rao	BTech 1979	CEO, GMR Airports Developers Ltd, India	
Vellayan Subbiah	BTech 1990	Chairman, Cholamandalam. Investment and Finance, India	
Venkat Rangan	BTech 1981	CTO, Clari Inc	
GDS Ramkumar	BTech 1990	Head of Engineering, Apple Info Apps	
Sankaran Naren	BTech 1987	CIO, ICICI Prudential AMC	
Mili Majumdar	MTech 1992	Managing Director, Green Building Council of India and Senior Vice President U.S. Green Building Council	
Palanivel Veeramuthuvel	Ph.D 2016	Project Director Chandrayaan 3, ISRO	
Unnikrishnan Nair	Ph.D 2011	Director, Vikram Sarabhai Space Centre (VSSC), India	
Vijay Ullal	BTech 1980	Founder and CEO Seabed VC	
M. P. Paranthaman	Ph.D 1988	Distinguished Corporate Fellow, Chemical Sciences Division, Oak Ridge National Laboratory USA	
Ram Sundaram	BTech 1988	Former Partner, Goldman Sachs USA	
Azeez Mohammed	BTech 1993	President and Chief Executive Officer, Covanta Holding Corporation	
Durga Malladi	BTech 1993	Senior Vice President and General Manager, Qualcomm USA	
Naveen Tahilyani	BTech 1995	CEO and MD, TATA AIA India	
Suresh Kumar	BTech 1987	CTO of Walmart	
S M Ramanathan		Director (Engineering, R&D), Bharat Heavy Electricals Limited (BHEL)	

== Government and politics ==
Name	Class year	Notability	References
Raju Narayana Swamy		IAS Officer; Secretary to Government, General Administration, Sainik Welfare, Kerala; former Commissioner of the Civil Supplies Department of Kerala	
Gopal Krishna Pillai	1970 (MSc) Chemistry	Retired IAS officer and former Home Secretary of India	
Ramjee Yadav	2024 (MTech) (Energy system)	Minister of Youth, Labour amd Employment of Nepal	

== Military and defense ==
Name	Class year	Notability	References
S. Christopher	PhD 1987	Secretary, Department of Defence R & D and DG @ DRDO; Defence Research and Development Organisation – Outstanding Scientist for 2012; IIT Madras Distinguished Alumnus Award—2016	
Sudhir Kumar Mishra	MTech 1987	Distinguished Scientist & Director General @ DRDO; CEO of BrahMos Aerospace; IIT Madras Distinguished Alumnus Award—2018	

== Notable faculty ==
Name	Affiliation	Notability	References
Thalappil Pradeep			
M. Thenmozhi			
Ashok Jhunjhunwala			
