= Balaji Sampath =

Indian educationist and social activist

- Born: 17 January 1973 (age 53); Chennai, India
- Education: IIT Madras, University of Maryland, College Park, USA (PhD)
- Occupations: Founder and Secretary, AID India & CPO of AhaGuru
- Website: www.ahaguru.com

Balaji Sampath (born 17 January 1973) is an Indian educationist, scientist, and the founder and secretary of Association for India's Development - India chapter, an India-based non-profit NGO that conducts science teaching and primary school programs for children to aid their educational development. He is also the founder and CPO of AhaGuru, an educational online coaching startup that provides training courses on different subjects online. He is also an author of science books for primary and higher level education.

== Personal life ==
Balaji was born in Chennai, India on 17 January 1973 into a family where both of his parents were government workers. Because his parents were often transferred to different locations for their government jobs, as a child Balaji was exposed to a number of schools across India. He had difficulty in understanding scientific subjects due to "ineffective teaching". Early in life, he devised his own system of analysis and arriving at solutions.

== Education ==
Balaji appeared for IIT JEE and obtained All India Rank 4 in 1990, considered one of the most difficult competitive exams in India. He completed his B.Tech. degree in Electrical Engineering from Indian Institute of Technology Madras in 1994, and his doctorate in Electronics and communication Engineering from University of Maryland, College Park.

== Career ==
Balaji started his career as a volunteer for AID United States chapter from 1994 while he was doing his doctorate. After completing his PhD degree, he returned to India to work full-time on social issues in 1997 and founded AID India. He worked with the Centre for Ecology and Rural Development and the Peoples Science Movement on Health and Education Programs. Balaji organized Peoples Health assembly campaign in 2000 at a national level and began campaigning for better public education and access to healthcare, especially in the rural areas.

AID India trains teachers in government schools with the goal of improving the quality of teaching, especially for science and mathematics by using innovative techniques and devising educational aid. The mission of AID India is to empower socially disadvantaged sections of the society through socio-economic development programs, education, providing micro credit, and providing training in the areas of health, human rights and utilization of resources for income generation.

In 2011, Balaji started Ahaguru.com, an online education portal to enhance science and math learning and problem-solving skills of middle and high school students. The startup, "a pioneer in online coaching", provides training courses completely online. It covers physics, chemistry and math for classes 7 to 12 for CBSE, NEET and JEE. The full year course is modelled like a classroom with teachers explaining concepts and showing how to solve different questions.

== Awards ==
- IIT Madras Distinguished Alumnus Award 2012.
- Times of India Social Impact Award for AID, 2011 from Prime Minister, Dr. Manmohan Singh in 2011.
- Ashoka Fellowship for innovative work on Science Education.
- Lemelson Inventor Certificate for Science Education.
- MIT Indus Technovator's Award 2005 for Village Libraries and Science Education.
- Rotary Distinguished Service Award by the Rotary Club of Madras South.
- Pratham USA Achievement Award 2006 for improving reading skills in Tamil Nadu.
- Association for India's Development JS Fellowship, 1998.
- All India Rank 4 in the IITJEE, 1990.

== See also ==
- List of Indian Institute of Technology Madras alumni
- Association for India's Development
