= Ultraviolette Automotive =

Indian electric vehicle manufacturer company

Ultraviolette Automotive Pvt. Ltd.
- Type: Privately Held
- Industry: Automotive; Electric vehicles; Motorcycle
- Founded: 2016; 10 years ago in Bangalore, India
- Founders: Narayan Subramaniam (CEO); Niraj Rajmohan (CTO)
- Headquarters: Bangalore, India
- Key people: Dulquer Salmaan
- Products: Ultraviolette F77
- Website: www.ultraviolette.com

Ultraviolette Automotive is an Indian electric vehicle startup company based in Bangalore, India. it was founded by Narayan Subramaniam and Niraj Rajmohan in 2016.

== History ==
Ultraviolette Automotive was founded in 2016 by Narayan Subramaniam (CEO) and Niraj Rajmohan (CTO). By 2022, the company had received US$15 million Series C Funding from TVS Motor Company and Zoho Corporation. Other Investors include Malayalam film actor Dulquer Salmaan and GoFrugal Technologies.

== Current Models ==
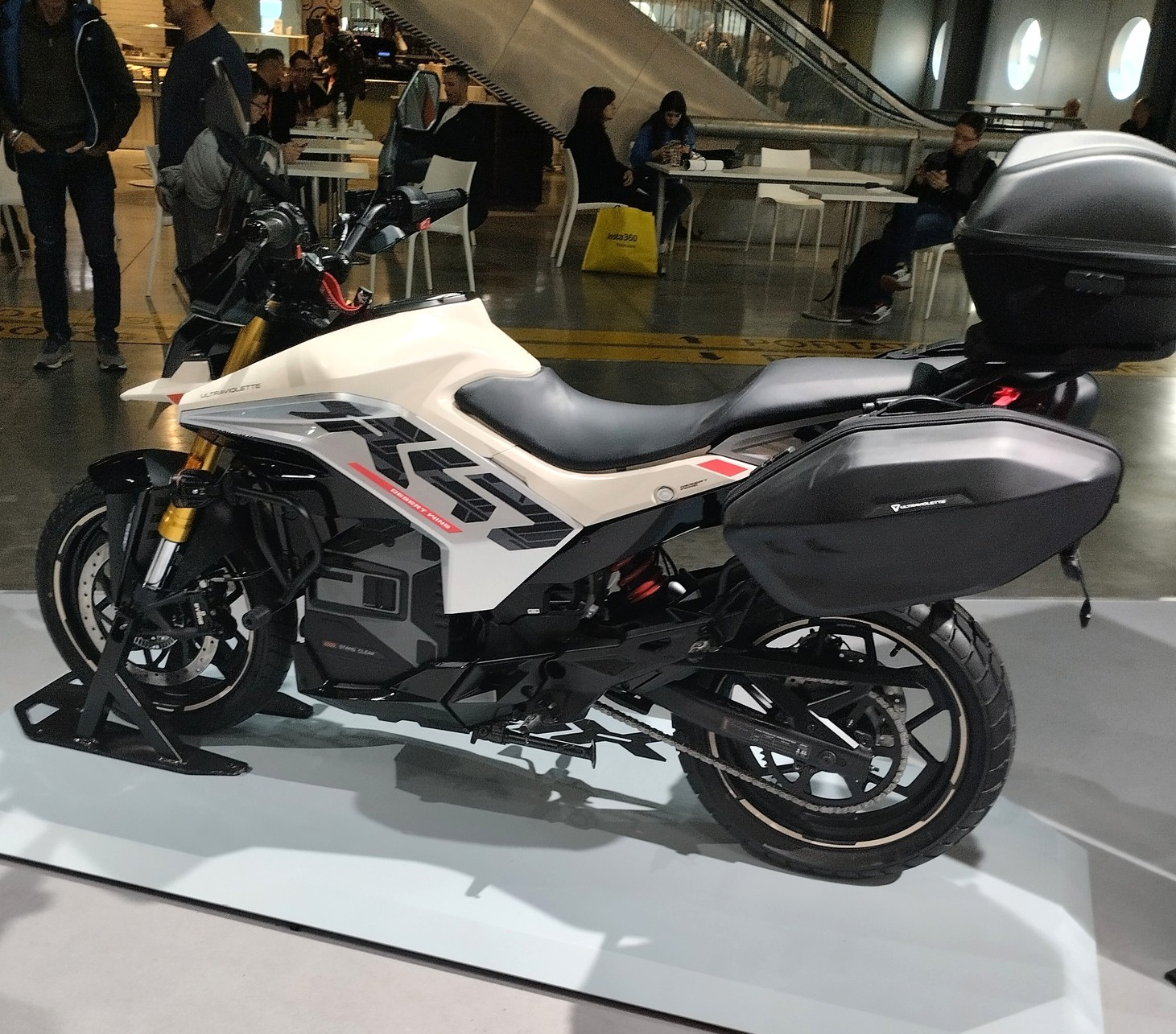
Ultraviolette X-47

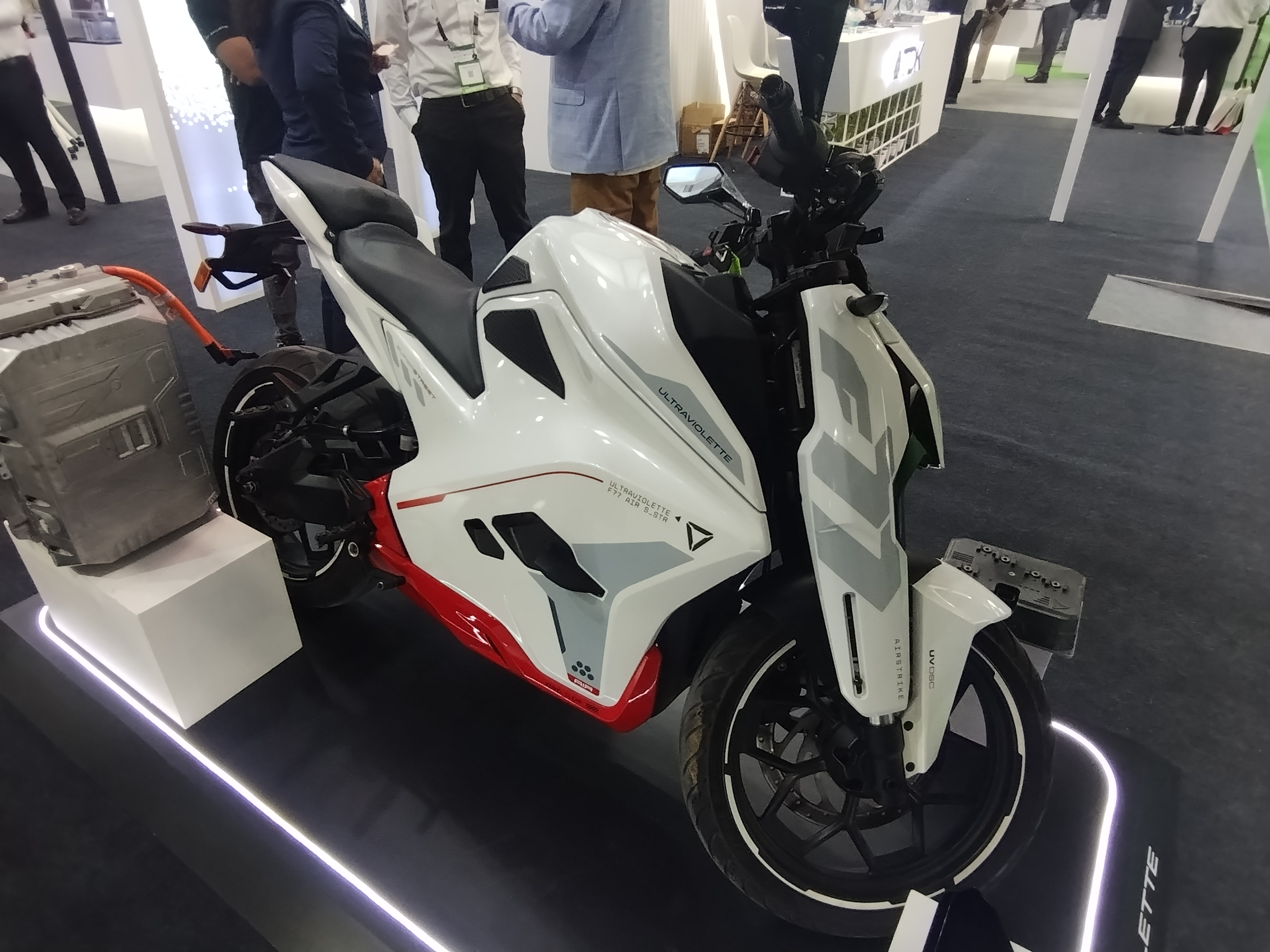
Ultraviolette Electronica

- Ultraviolette F77
- Ultraviolette F99
- Ultraviolette F77 Mach 2
- Ultraviolette Tesseract
- Ultraviolette Shockwave
- Ultraviolette X-47 Crossover
