= Radha Vembu =

Indian billionaire businesswoman (born 24 December 1972)

- Born: 1972 or 1973 (age 53–54)
- Education: IIT Madras
- Occupation: Business Woman
- Known for: Majority Owner of Zoho Corporation
- Spouse: Rajendran Dhandapani
- Children: Adithya Rajendran
- Relatives: Sridhar Vembu (brother)

Radha Vembu (born 24 December 1972) is an Indian billionaire businesswoman and the owner of a majority stake in Zoho Corporation, an Indian software development company co-founded by her brother, Sridhar Vembu.

== Early life ==
Vembu has a degree in industrial management from the Indian Institute of Technology Madras.

== Career ==
Zoho Corporation was co-founded by her brother Sridhar Vembu and Tony Thomas, who started the business in 1996 as AdventNet. She owns a majority stake in the company and is a product manager for email service, Zoho Mail, and also the director of Corpus Foundation. She actively keeps herself away from the limelight.

She is listed in Hurun India 2025 Women Leaders.

== Personal life ==
Radha Vembu is married, with one child, and lives in Chennai, Tamil Nadu, India.
