= Sridhar Vembu =

Indian entrepreneur

- Born: 1968 (age 57–58); Tanjore, Tamil Nadu, India
- Education: IIT Madras (BTech); Princeton University (MS, PhD)
- Occupation: Businessman
- Title: Co-founder and chief scientist of Zoho Corporation
- Spouse: Pramila Srinivasan
- Relatives: Radha Vembu (sister)
- Honours: Padma Shri (2021)
- Scientific career
- Thesis: Information Theory without Ergodicity Assumptions: Some New Results (1994)
- Doctoral advisor: Sergio Verdú

Sridhar Vembu (born 1968) is an Indian billionaire business magnate and the founder and former chief executive officer of the Zoho Corporation. As per the Forbes list of India's 100 richest tycoons, dated October 8, 2025, Vembu and siblings are ranked 51st, with a net worth of US$6 billion.

He was awarded India's fourth highest civilian award, the Padma Shri, in 2021.

== Personal life ==
Vembu was born in 1968 in a middle class Tamil Hindu family, in a village in Thanjavur district, Tamil Nadu. He graduated with a bachelor's degree in Electrical Engineering from the Indian Institute of Technology, Madras in 1989, and earned his MS and PhD in Electrical Engineering from Princeton University in New Jersey.

In 2026, a California court granted Vembu's estranged wife's request that he post US$1.7 billion bond in a divorce proceeding. They have a son with autism.

== Career ==
Vembu started his professional career working for Qualcomm as a wireless engineer in San Diego, California, before moving to the San Francisco Bay Area. He has lived in San Jose and Pleasanton.

In 1996, Vembu, along with two of his brothers, founded a software development house for network equipment providers called AdventNet. The company was renamed Zoho Corporation in 2009, focusing on providing SaaS support to Customer relationship management services. Vembu moved to Tenkasi, India in 2019. As of 2020, he held an 88 per cent stake in the company. Forbes estimated his net worth at US$2.44 billion. In 2021, Vembu was appointed to the National Security Advisory Board. Despite being a unicorn, Zoho has been completely bootstrapped by Vembu and his co-founder Tony Thomas to avoid external influence.

=== Social entrepreneurship ===
Vembu is noted for taking software and product development functions from urban centres into rural villages in India. His company, Zoho, established its offices in rural Mathalamparai, Tenkasi district, Tamil Nadu and in suburban Renigunta, Andhra Pradesh. He moved from the Bay Area to Mathalamparai at this time.

In 2004, he set up Zoho Schools to provide vocational software development education to rural students as an alternative to formal university education. A statement from the company states that 15 to 20 per cent of its engineers have no college degree, but have received vocational education from Zoho Schools. In 2020, he announced a "rural school startup" focused on free primary education.

== Political views ==
A former Zoho product marketing manager resigned in October 2018 after a dispute with Vembu over the employee's post on the company's intranet discussion forum. The employee stated that Vembu was hostile to him for criticising the Rashtriya Swayamsevak Sangh (RSS), a Hindu nationalist paramilitary organisation.

In January 2020, Vembu met with criticism after he attended, as the guest of honour, a high-profile event organised by the RSS. Vembu defended his participation as a matter of his personal choice.

== Honours ==
Vembu was awarded the 2019 Ernst & Young "Entrepreneur of the Year Award" in India. He was also the recipient of the Padma Shri, India's fourth highest civilian honour, in 2021. He was selected as CNN-News18 Indian of the Year 2022. He was appointed to the National Security Advisory Board (NSAB) of India in 2021.
