= Shanthi Pavan =

Indian electrical engineer and a professor (born 1973)

- Born: 1 June 1973 (age 53); India
- Education: IIT Madras; Columbia University; Texas Instruments
- Known for: Studies on mixed signal VLSI circuits
- Awards: 2006 INAE Young Engineer Award; 2009 IEEE CSS Darlington Best Paper Award; 2009 IITM Young Faculty Recognition Award; 2010 IESA Technomentor Award; 2012 Shanti Swarup Bhatnagar Prize; 2016 IITM Mid-career Research and Development Award; 2018 IEEE Fellow
- Scientific career
- Fields: Electrical engineering
- Workplaces: Big Bear Networks; IIT Madras
- Doctoral advisor: Yannis Tsividis

Yendluri Shanthi Pavan (born 1973) is an Indian electrical engineer and a professor at the Department of Electrical Engineering of the Indian Institute of Technology, Madras. He is known for his studies on mixed signal VLSI circuits and is an elected fellow of the Indian National Academy of Engineering. He is also a fellow of IEEE. The Council of Scientific and Industrial Research, the apex agency of the Government of India for scientific research, awarded him the Shanti Swarup Bhatnagar Prize for Science and Technology, one of the highest Indian science awards for his contributions to Engineering Sciences in 2012.

== Biography ==
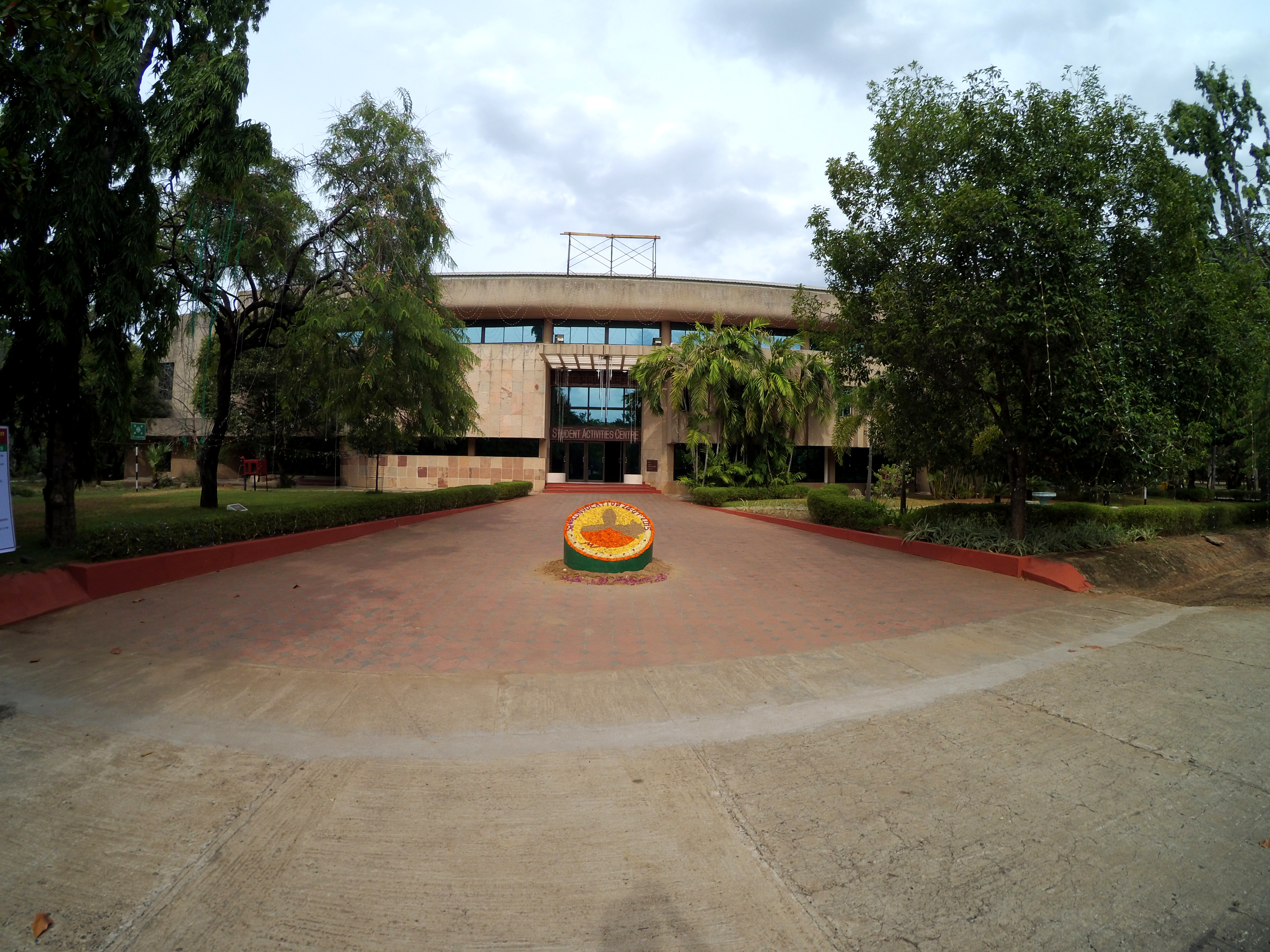
Student Activities Center, IIT Madras

Y. Shanti Pavan, born on the first day of June 1973, did his graduate studies in electronics and communication engineering at the Indian Institute of Technology, Madras from where he earned a BTech in 1995 and moved to the US to pursue his higher studies. Joining Columbia University, he secured a master's degree in 1997 and followed it up with a PhD in 1999. His postdoctoral studies were at Texas Instruments at their Warren centre and in 2000, he started his career at Big Bear Networks, Sunnyvale. Returning to India in 2002, he joined his alma mater, IIT Madras, as a member of faculty and serves as a professor at the department of electrical engineering.

During his postdoctoral studies, Pavan worked on high speed analog filters and data converters and shifted his focus to microwave ICs for data communication while working in Sunnyvale. Later, he concentrated on analog mixed signal VLSI circuits and has since developed many designs of core components of electronic systems. He has documented his researches by way of several articles; a number of online repositories of scientific articles, have listed many of them. He holds two patents viz. Low distortion filters and Method and apparatus for low power continuous time delta sigma modulation and has developed a series of video lectures. He has also been associated with IEEE Transactions on Circuits and Systems journal, serving as a member of the editorial board of Part II - Express Briefs during 2006–07 and as the Deputy Editor-in-chief and Editor-in-chief of Part I - Regular Papers for the terms 2012–13 and 2014–15 respectively.

== Awards and honors ==
Pavan received the Young Engineer Award of the Indian National Academy of Engineering in 2006; INAE would honor him again in 2011 with an elected fellowship. He was selected for the Swarnajayanthi Fellowship of the Department of Science and Technology for the year 2008–09 and this fellowship assisted him in pursuing his researches on gold nanowires. In 2009, one of his articles earned him the Darlington Best Paper Award of the IEEE Circuits and Systems Society, the same year as he received the Young Faculty Recognition Award of IIT Madras. Technomentor Award of India Electronics and Semiconductor Association reached him in 2010 and the Council of Scientific and Industrial Research awarded him the Shanti Swarup Bhatnagar Prize, one of the highest Indian science awards in 2012. IEEE Solid State Circuits Society honored him again in 2016 with the Distinguished Lecturer-ship and he received one more honor from IIT Madras in the form of Mid-career Research and Development Award in 2016. He was elected as IEEE fellow in 2018 for his contributions to Delta-Sigma Modulators and analog filters. He was also a member of the 2019 Fellow Evaluation Committee for the elevation of the 2020 Class of Fellows via the IEEE Solid-State Circuits Society.

== See also ==
- Very-large-scale integration
