= Ultraviolette Tesseract =

Electric Scooter

- Manufacturer: Ultraviolette Automotive
- Class: EV Scooter
- Engine: 14.91kW electric motor
- Top speed: 125 kmph
- Power: 20.1 BHP
- Transmission: Automatic
- Brakes: Disc; Dual Channel ABS
- Tires: Front: 110/80-14; Rear: 140/70-14
- Wheelbase: Front: 355.6mm Rear: 355.6mm
- Fuel capacity: 3.7 kW battery
- Range: 167 km (103 mi)

The Ultraviolette Tesseract is an electric scooter manufactured by Ultraviolette. It is powered by a 20.1 BHP electric motor and claims the acceleration of 0 - 60 kmph in 2.9 seconds.

== Features ==
The scooter features digital touchscreen display includes odometer and speedometer along with Bluetooth, WiFi connectivity. It is the first EV scooter to feature Front and Rear dashcam, Park Assist, Blind Spot Detection, Front And Rear Collision Alerts, Delta Watch Towing Alert, Lane Change Assist, Built To Be Seen, Wireless Phone Charging, Dynamic Stability Control. It has a range of 167 km (103 mi) with 30 minutes fast charging (0-80%). It has a battery capacity of 3.5 kW and 5, 6kW will be available in future.

The scooter have 4 colour variant which are Stealth Black, Solar White, Sonic Pink and Dessert Sand. The scooter can accelerate from 0 to 60 kmph in 2.9 seconds with a top speed of 125 kmph.
