= M. Thenmozhi =

- Known for: EXIM Bank of India Chair Professor (2016)
- Awards: Atal Bihari Vajpayee National Award (2003)
- Scientific career
- Fields: Management Science, Project Management, Operations Research
- Institutions: Indian Institute of Technology, Madras, IIT Madras

M. Thenmozhi holds the position of Professor at the Department of Management Studies at the Indian Institute of Technology Madras in Chennai. Previously in 2016 she held the EXIM Bank of India Chair Professorship.

== Career ==
Before her tenure at IIT Madras, she served as the director at the National Institute of Securities Markets in Mumbai. Preceding this, she served as a faculty member within the Management Division of the Department of Industrial Engineering and Management at Anna University in Chennai.

She has been researcher and teacher in the area of finance management for more than 28 years. As a faculty she has been involved with the following universities and educational institutes UPM Madrid, University of Passau, Lagos Business School, Nigeria, QUT, Brisbane and San Diego State University, US.

== Awards ==
1. Top 100 Women in Finance in India in 2019.
2. Executive Endeavour Fellow (2007) of the Australian Government.
3. Fulbright-Nehru Visiting Lecturer Fellowship (2011).
4. European Union Erasmus Mundus Scholarship (2009).
5. Atal Bihari Vajpayee National Award (2003) for developing the best manufacturing policy draft for India.
6. EXIM Bank Chair Professorship (2016) in Finance.
