= Ramarathnam Narasimhan =

Indian mechanical engineer

- Born: 31 March 1960 (age 66); Tamil Nadu, India
- Education: IIT Madras; Caltech
- Known for: Studies on fracture mechanics
- Awards: 1988 SPIE Rudolph Kingslake Medal; 1999 Shanti Swarup Bhatnagar Prize; 2003 IISc Rustom Choksi Award; 2016 IITM Distinguished Alumnus Award
- Scientific career
- Fields: Fracture mechanics
- Workplaces: Caltech; IIT Bombay; Indian Institute of Science; Royal Institute of Technology; Institute for High Performance Computing; National University of Singapore
- Doctoral advisor: Ares J. Rosakis

Ramarathnam Narasimhan (born 1960) is an Indian materials engineer and a professor at the Department of Mechanical Engineering of the Indian Institute of Science. He is known for his pioneering researches on fracture mechanics and is an elected fellow of the Indian Academy of Sciences, Indian National Science Academy and the Indian National Academy of Engineering. The Council of Scientific and Industrial Research, the apex agency of the Government of India for scientific research, awarded him the Shanti Swarup Bhatnagar Prize for Science and Technology, one of the highest Indian science awards for his contributions to Engineering Sciences in 1999. (Note: Long link - please select award year to see details)

== Biography ==
R. Narasimhan, born on 31 May 1960 in the south Indian state of Tamil Nadu, gained a graduate degree in engineering from the Indian Institute of Technology, Madras in 1982 and moved to the US to join the California Institute of Technology from where he secured a master's degree in mechanical engineering in 1983 and followed it up with a PhD in Applied Mechanics in 1986. His post-doctoral studies were also at Caltech at the laboratory of Ares J. Rosakis, simultaneously working as a faculty at the institute. On his return to India, he joined the Indian Institute of Technology, Bombay in 1987 where he stayed for four years before joining the Indian Institute of Science in 1991 and serves IISc as a professor at the department of mechanical engineering. During this period, he had three sabbaticals; once in Sweden at the Royal Institute of Technology and twice in Singapore at the Institute for High Performance Computing, Singapore and at National University of Singapore.

== Legacy ==
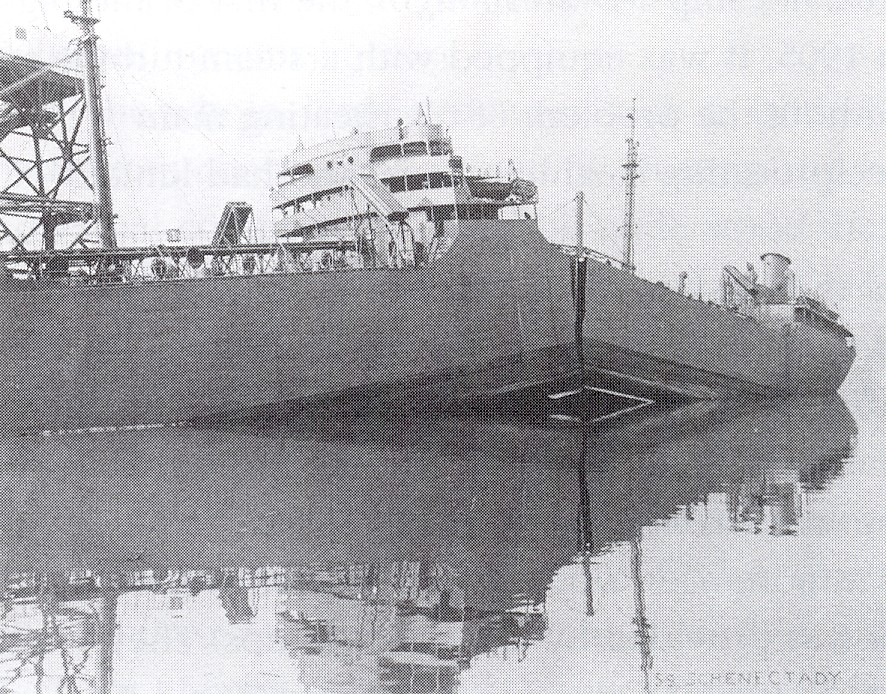
The S.S. Schenectady split apart by brittle fracture while in harbor, 1943.

Narasimhan's researches have been focused on the theoretical, computational and applied aspects of Solid Mechanics, Fracture Mechanics and Mechanics of Materials. During his post-doctoral days at Caltech, he worked with Rosakis on elastic-plastic solids with regard to crack initiation and growth and their studies on three-dimensional effects on elastic-plastic crack tip fields demonstrated the dominance of the effect at a distance of half the specimen thickness from the crack front. He has also worked on the deformation and fracture behaviour of bulk metallic glasses and is credited with the development of a method for quantifying the micro-mechanics of mixed mode ductile fracture involving microvoid coalescence and shear band. Collaborating with Upadrasta Ramamurty, his colleague at IISc, he worked on fracture mechanics of bulk metallic glasses and these studies enabled them to identify the time scale of fracture as well as to propose an explanation for the nano-trenches. He has documented his researches in several articles; (Note: Please see Selected bibliography section) ResearchGate and Google Scholar, online repositories of scientific articles, have listed 103 and 141 of them respectively.

Narasimhan is a former member of the Science and Engineering Research Board of the Department of Science and Technology. He sits in the editorial boards of journals including Engineering Fracture Mechanics and Journal of Mechanics and Physics of Solids of Elsevier, and the International Journal of Fracture of Springer. Besides, he is a former member of the editorial board of Current Science journal of the Indian Academy of Sciences. He has mentored a number of master's and doctoral scholars in their studies and has delivered several keynote or invited speeches including at the Complex Geometry and Operator Theory conference jointly organized by the Indian Statistical Institute and Institute of Mathematical Sciences in December 2015.

== Awards and honors ==
His work alongside Ares Rosakis at Caltech earned Narasimhan the Rudolph Kingslake Medal of the SPIE, an honor he shared with Rosakis and Alan Taylor Zehnder in 1988. The Council of Scientific and Industrial Research awarded him the Shanti Swarup Bhatnagar Prize, one of the highest Indian science awards in 1999. The Indian Academy of Sciences elected him as a fellow in 2000 and he became an elected fellow of the Indian National Science Academy in 2002. A year later, the Indian Institute of Science awarded him the 2003 Prof. Rustom Choksi Award for Excellence in Research and he received the Distinguished Alumnus Award of the Indian Institute of Technology, Madras in 2016. Narasimhan, who has been holding the J. C. Bose National Fellowship of the Department of Science and Technology of India since 2010, is also an elected fellow of the Indian National Academy of Engineering.

== Selected bibliography ==
- Ghosal, A. K.; Narasimhan, R. (1997). "A finite element study of the effect of void initiation and growth on mixed-mode ductile fracture". Mechanics of Materials. 25 (2): 113–127. doi:10.1016/S0167-6636(96)00047-6.
- Roy, Y. Arun; Narasimhan, R.; Arora, P. R. (1999). "An experimental investigation of constraint effects on mixed mode fracture initiation in a ductile aluminium alloy". Acta Metallurgica Sinica. 47 (5): 1587–1596. Bibcode:1999AcMat..47.1587A. doi:10.1016/S1359-6454(99)00015-4.
- Basu, Sumit; Narasimhan, R. (2000). "A numerical investigation of loss of crack tip constraint in a dynamically loaded ductile specimen". Mechanics and Physics of Solids. 48 (9): 1967–1985. Bibcode:2000JMPSo..48.1967B. doi:10.1016/S0022-5096(99)00078-2.
- Jayadevan, K. R.; Narasimhan, R.; Ramamurthy, T. S.; Dattaguru, B. (2001). "A numerical study of T-stress in dynamically loaded fracture specimens". International Journal of Solids and Structures. 38 (28–29): 4987–5005. doi:10.1016/S0020-7683(00)00323-1.
- Biswas, P.; Narasimhan, R. (2002). "A numerical study of constraint effects on dynamic ductile crack initiation". Mechanics of Materials. 34 (9): 577–592. doi:10.1016/S0167-6636(02)00154-0.
- Narasimhan, R. (2004). "Analysis of indentation of pressure sensitive plastic solids using the expanding cavity model". Mechanics of Materials. 36 (7): 633–645. doi:10.1016/S0167-6636(03)00075-9.
- Subramanya, H. Y.; Viswanath, S.; Narasimhan, R. (2007). "A three-dimensional numerical study of mode I crack tip fields in pressure sensitive plastic solids". Journal of Solids and Structures. 44 (6): 1863–1879. doi:10.1016/j.ijsolstr.2006.08.003.

== See also ==
- Ductility
- Solid mechanics
- Bhagavatula Dattaguru
