= Anand Rajaraman =

Indian-American businessman

Anand Rajaraman is a Web and technology entrepreneur. He is the co-founder of Cambrian Ventures and Kosmix. Rajaraman also co-founded former Junglee Corp. and played a significant role at Amazon.com in the late 1990s.

== Personal life and education ==
Rajaraman was born in Chennai, India. He has an MS and a PhD (2001) in computer science from Stanford University, under Jeffrey Ullman, and a Bachelor of Technology in computer science from IIT Madras (Class of 1993).

== Career ==
Together with four other engineers, Rajaraman founded Junglee Corp. in 1996. Junglee Corp. pioneered Internet comparison shopping. Junglee Corp. was acquired by Amazon.com Inc. in August 1998 for 1.6 million shares of stock valued at $250 million. Rajaraman went on to become Director of Technology at Amazon.com, where he was responsible for technology strategy. He helped launch the transformation of Amazon.com from a retailer into a retail platform, enabling third-party retailers to sell on Amazon.com's website. Third-party transactions now account for almost 25% of all US transactions, and represent Amazon's fastest-growing and most profitable business segment as of 2009. Third party transactions have grown considerably since then. Rajaraman also was an inventor of the concept underlying Amazon.com’s Mechanical Turk.

Rajaraman and his business partner, Venky Harinarayan, co-founded Cambrian Ventures, an early stage VC fund, in 2000. Cambrian went on to back several companies later acquired by Google. Cambrian has funded companies like Mobissimo, Aster Data Systems and TheFind.com. In April 2011, Kosmix was acquired by Walmart.

In addition to acting as a consulting assistant professor in the Computer Science Department at Stanford University, Rajaraman is a special partner to NeoTribe Ventures and publishes a blog called Datawocky, on which he discusses data mining techniques in search, social media, and advertising.
