= Venky Harinarayan =

Indian businessman

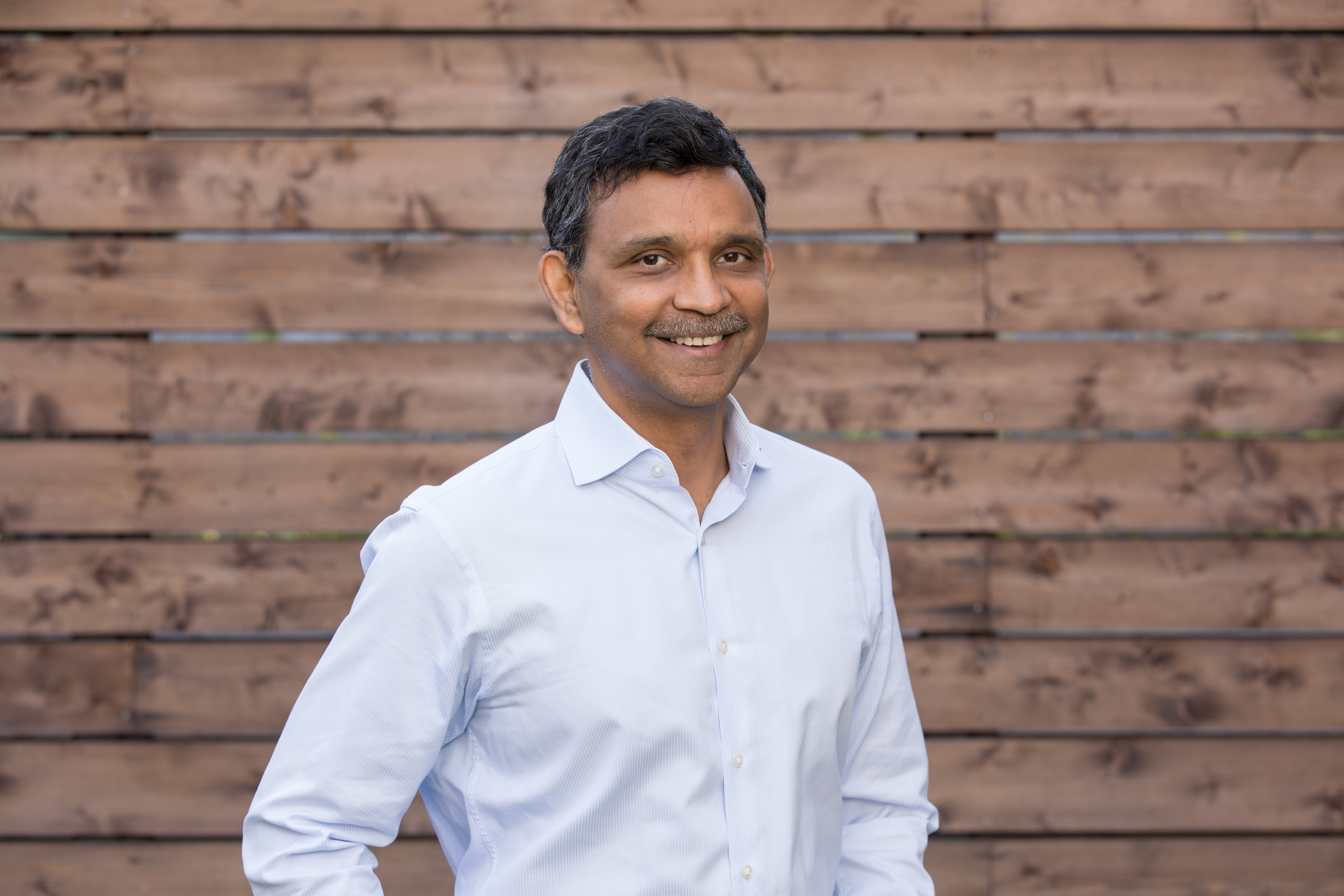
- Born: Venkatesh Harinarayan; Chennai, Tamil Nadu, India
- Education: Stanford University (PhD), IIT Madras, (B.Tech.)
- Occupations: Cambrian Ventures, Kosmix and Junglee Corp

Venkatesh "Venky" Harinarayan is an Indian entrepreneur. He is the co-founder of Cambrian Ventures and Kosmix. Harinarayan also co-founded Junglee Corp. and played a significant role at Amazon.com in the late 1990s. Originally from Bombay, India, Harinarayan has a PhD in computer science from Stanford University (1997, under Jeffrey Ullman) and a masters from UCLA. Bachelor of Technology He completed his bachelor's degree in computer science from IIT Madras (Class of 1988). While at Stanford, Harinarayan co-wrote a paper on implementing data cubes with Anand Rajaraman and Jeff Ullman, which is among the top 600 most cited computer science articles over the last 20 years.

Together with four other engineers, Harinarayan founded Junglee Corp. in 1996. Junglee Corp. pioneered Internet comparison shopping. Junglee Corp. was acquired by Amazon.com Inc. in August 1998 for 1.6 million shares of stock valued at $250 million. Harinarayan then became general manager at Amazon.com, where he worked with founder and CEO Jeff Bezos to help create Amazon.com's marketplace business. Marketplace is currently Amazon.com's most profitable and fastest-growing business, accounting for almost 25% of all US transactions. Harinarayan also was an inventor of the concept underlying Amazon.com's Mechanical Turk.

Harinarayan and his business partner, Anand Rajaraman, co-founded Cambrian Ventures, an early stage venture capital fund, in 2000. Cambrian went on to back several companies later acquired by Google. Cambrian funded companies like Mobissimo, Aster Data Systems and TheFind.com. In 2017, Harinarayan became a special partner to NeoTribe Ventures.
