= Gangan Prathap =

Indian scientist (born 1951)

- Born: 6 June 1951 (age 75); Singapore
- Education: IIT Madras
- Awards: Shanti Swarup Bhatnagar Prize (1990)
- Scientific career
- Fields: Structural mechanics, composite material, finite elements and information science

Gangan Prathap (born 6 June 1951) is an Indian scientist/engineer specialising in structural mechanics, composite material, finite elements and information science. After his graduation in Aerospace Engineering from IIT Madras, he was with National Aerospace Laboratories, Bangalore, for about twenty years serving the laboratory as scientist at several levels. In April 2000, he took over as Scientist-in-Charge, CSIR Centre for Mathematical Modelling and Computer Simulation and held that position till January 2008. He had also served as the Vice-Chancellor, Cochin University of Science and Technology, for a short period from February 2008 to February 2009. After leaving CUSAT, Prathap took charge as director of National Institute of Science Communication and Information Resources (NISCAIR), and continued in that position till his retirement on superannuation from government service. Since August 2013, he has held the position of Outstanding Scientist at National Institute for Interdisciplinary Science and Technology (NIIST), Thiruvananthapuram. He is also an Honorary Professor of A P J Abdul Kalam Technological University.

== Early life ==
Gangan Prathap was born in Singapore. His father was with the Royal Navy in Singapore. He had his school education in Raffles Institution in Singapore. He had a highly successful formal education in the sense that he had stood first in all the school/college/university examinations he wrote. He had secured first rank in the Raffles Institution, first rank in pre-university (for which he studied in Madras Christian College, Chennai), first rank in the Joint Entrance Examination for admission to the IIT's, and first rank in BTech Degree programme of IIT Madras. He secured his BTech in Aerospace Engineering from IIT Madras in 1974 and PhD from the same institute in 1978.

== Academic and research achievements ==
Gangan Prathap has made significant contributions in non-linear structural mechanics. He has also contributed to the development of finite elements and its applications to problems in computational structural mechanics. From 1992 to 2000, he contributed to production-run structural analysis for various aircraft projects. He was also interested in history and philosophy of science and scientometrics. He proposed quantitative approaches to problems of a sociological nature. He has over 400 scientific and technical reports, of which over 100 have appeared in Science Citation Index (SCI) journals. He has also written a book on the finite element method.

== Honors and awards ==
- Gangan Prathap was awarded the Shanti Swarup Bhatnagar Prize for Science and Technology in Engineering Science in 1990. The award citation states thus: "Dr. Prathap has made contribution to gaining fundamental understanding of finite element formulations. He addressed himself to a problem confounding the community of researchers and practitioners in computational mechanics, namely, obtaining entirely robust formulations. He has resolved the problem by evolving the concept of field consistency and field consistent elements. He has validated the concept by applying it to a range of structural problems."
- He was elected Fellow of the Indian Academy of Sciences, Bangalore in 1990.
