= Sujatha Srinivasan =

Sujatha Srinivasan is a professor in the department of mechanical engineering at the Indian Institute of Technology Madras where she also heads the National Center for Assistive Health Technologies and the Rehabilitation Research and Device Development. In these roles she researches assistive technologies with a focus on applying design and biomechanics to make them functional and affordable. Srinivasan is also an honorary professor at Imperial College London.

== Education ==
Srinivasan graduated with a B.Tech in Mechanical Engineering from IIT-Madras in 1992 then completed a masters of science in mechanical engineering (MSME) at the University of Toledo, USA in 1994. She worked in the prosthetics industry for many years before doing her PhD work at Ohio State University, graduating in 2007.

== Research ==
Srinivasan is the leader of Rehabilitation Research and Device Development (R2D2), a research group that integrates investigations into human movement with designing and developing technologies for rehabilitation and assistance for people with movement impairments. Their aim to increase the affordability and thus accessibility of assistive devices is supported by their collaborations (eg: clinical specialists, NGOs, hospitals) and industrial partners including their start-up NeoMotion.

In 2025 the collaboration between her research group and Thryv Mobility produced the "lightest wheel chair in India", it weighs 8.5 kg and is made of aerospace grade material.

=== Honors ===
- In 2019 - 2020 she received the Abdul Kalam Technology Innovation National Fellowship which allowed her to research and develop a easy-to-operate affordable locked knee joint for people struggling with Knee Ankle Foot Orthosis (KAFO).
- In 2021 her research group R2D2 was awarded the ‘Best Assistive Technology Initiative Among Educational Institutes’ by Assistech Foundation (ATF).
