= Mathalamparai =

Village in Tamil Nadu, India

- village
- Location in Tamil Nadu, India Mathalamparai (India)
- Coordinates: 8.9068°N 77.3782°E
- Country: India
- State: Tamil Nadu
- District: Tenkasi district

Languages
  - Official: Tamil
- Time zone: UTC+5:30 (IST)

Mathalamparai is a gram panchayat,and suburb of Tenkasi city and located in the Tenkasi Panchayat Union of Tenkasi district, Tamil Nadu. This panchayat falls under both the Tenkasi Assembly Constituency and the Tenkasi Lok Sabha Constituency. The panchayat comprises a total of 7 ward constituencies, from which 7 ward members are elected. Zoho Corporation has their branch office in this village.

According to the 2011 Census of India, the total population of the village is 1,811, of which 960 are women and 851 are men.

List of Villages located in this panchayat are:

- Aasad Nagar
- Maththalampaarai
- Muthu Vinayagarpuram
