= Walmart Global Tech =

American subsidiary of Walmart

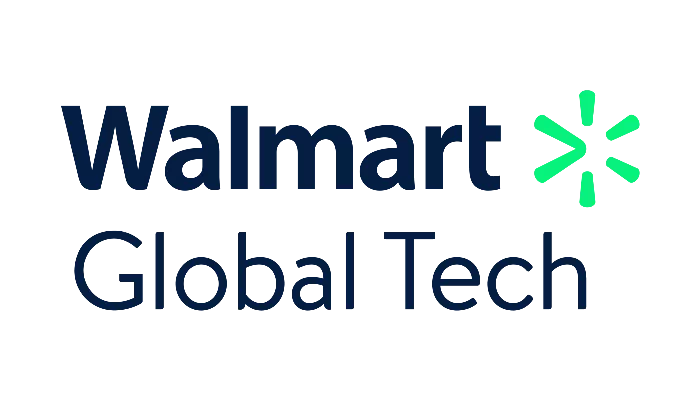
- Logo used since 2026
- Formerly: Kosmix (2006–2011); WalmartLabs (2011–2019)
- Type: Subsidiary
- Industry: Internet; Retail
- Founded: Kosmix founded in Mountain View, California (2005) @WalmartLabs (2011)
- Founder: Venky Harinarayan (Kosmix); Anand Rajaraman (Kosmix)
- Headquarters: Bentonville, Arkansas (Walmart Global Tech HQ); San Bruno, California (Walmart Labs HQ), United States
- Area served: Worldwide
- Key people: Suresh Kumar (CTO and CDO)
- Products: Websites and apps for Walmart and Sam's Club; Vudu; OneOps; Electrode
- Number of employees: 25,000+ (2023)
- Parent: Walmart

Walmart Global Tech (abbreviated as WGT; formerly Walmart Labs and Kosmix) is the technology and innovation arm of Walmart Inc.. It functions as a large-scale engineering and business services organization that powers the company's global retail operations.

Its origins trace back to 2005, when Venky Harinarayan and Anand Rajaraman founded Kosmix, a social media and search startup. In April 2011, Walmart acquired Kosmix and used it as the foundation to establish @WalmartLabs, a dedicated research and innovation division focused on advancing the company's digital capabilities.

Over time, Walmart expanded and restructured its technology operations, and in 2016 it merged Walmart Labs with its Information Systems Division (ISD) to create a unified organization called Walmart Technology. This move was aimed at better integrating digital and physical retail systems, improving coordination between online platforms and in-store operations.

In August 2020, Walmart Technology launched its new identity as Walmart Global Tech as part of a new technology and shared services organization within the retailer.

In 2025, Walmart officially merged its separate technology and AI teams into a consolidated organization and further in May 2026, Walmart is officially merging its global technology and product teams into a unified structure.

== History ==
=== Kosmix ===
Harinarayan and Rajaraman were co-founders of Junglee, the first shopping search engine which was acquired by Amazon.com in 1998. They later created Amazon.com's Mechanical Turk and started an early-stage VC fund, Cambrian Ventures, that backed several companies later acquired by Google.

Kosmix expanded its focus from vertical to a horizontal search engine in June 2008, covering all subjects. For a key word or topic that a user enters, "Kosmix gathers content from across the Web to build a sort of multimedia encyclopedia entry on the fly. The company has built a taxonomy of nearly five million categories on a wide range of topics. The taxonomy includes millions of connections mapping the relationship among those categories."

In June 2007, Kosmix announced a partnership with Revolution Health, in which Revolution Health will utilize Kosmix to enhance content searches on RevolutionHealth.com.

Truveo announced in September 2007 that the company's video search engine is being used by Kosmix to present topic-relevant videos on its health site RightHealth, giving users a starting point to explore health topics. As of March 2008, Kosmix' market-share had grown 730% year-over-year. RightHealth was the #2 health site on the Web, according to Hitwise. Kosmix launched a personal news site called MeeHive in March, 2008 which is similar to Google News or My Yahoo!, but allows users to customize their interests to a greater degree. Meehive was shut down in October 2010. Kosmix launched tweetbeat in June 2010 as it entered the social media arena.

In October 2009, Kosmix acquired Cruxlux, an engine designed to take any two people, places, or things and tell the user how they are connected. Cruxlux was founded in 2007 by Guha Jayachandran and Curtis Spencer and was in private beta at the time of the acquisition. The terms of the deal are mostly unknown, other than that it was made in both cash and stock.

In April 2011, Kosmix announced a partnership with Ask The Doctor, in which their website AskTheDoctor.com would provide Q & A format medical content for Kosmix's website RightHealth.

== Walmart ==
Walmart Labs

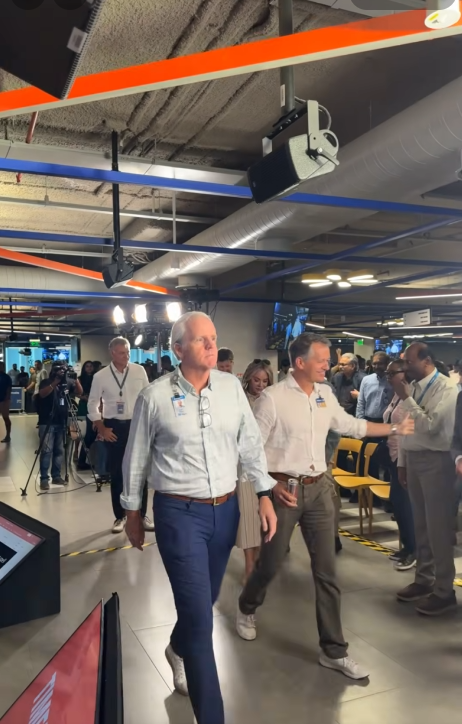
John Furner, President and CEO of Walmart Inc. visiting Walmart Global Tech office in Bangalore, India in 2026.

Kosmix was acquired by Walmart in April 2011 and became @WalmartLabs for a rumored amount of $300 million. In June 2012, Harinarayan and Rajaraman announced that they would be leaving the company to take some time off, with no immediate plans.

In June 2013, Walmart bought predictive intelligence startup Inkiru to add analytics capabilities. In June 2018, Walmart announced it would hire 2,000 additional employees into Walmart Labs to improve the company's online grocery shopping platform. In July 2019, it acquired health tech startup FloCare and B2B wholesale trading platform BigTrade to bolster its customer service.

Some products developed at Walmart Labs are Social Genome, ShoppyCat, and Get on the Shelf.

=== Walmart Global Tech ===
In 2020, Walmart Labs launched its new global identity as Walmart Global Tech. Walmart Global Tech develops and manages the foundational technologies on which Walmart Inc.'s customer experiences are built, including cloud, data, enterprise architecture, DevOps, infrastructure and security. The tech organization powers Walmart Inc. and its business units, including Walmart U.S., Sam's Club and Walmart International. It is also an enterprise services organization that develops solutions to help 2.3 million Walmart and Sam's Club associates work and live better.

The domains under Global Tech are -

- Customer Experience (CX) and Merchant Tech - The Customer Engagement Services (CES) is located in the Walmart Change Office Building at the new 350-acre Walmart Home Office campus.
- Supply Chain and Fulfillment Tech
- Global Marketplace and Merchant Tech
- Data and Global AI Operations
- Infrastructure, Cloud and DevOps
- Information Security and Governance
- Enterprise Services / Associate Tech

Since 2021, WGT has collaborated with IBM to explore supply chain use cases and customer personalization.

==== Element ====
In 2022, Walmart introduced Element as a proprietary, internal, multi-cloud, end-to-end machine learning platform. It was designed specifically to build, scale, and manage AI and GenAI applications across Walmart.

==== Wibey and Wallaby ====
In August 2025, Walmart introduced an internal “super agent” for engineers called Wibey, designed to streamline and coordinate the work of over 200 separate AI agents already in use across the company. The company built Wallaby, a collection of retail-focused LLMs designed to provide highly contextual responses for customer and associate experiences.

==== Sparky, a GenAI assistant ====
In June 2025, Walmart launched Sparky, an agentic, generative AI shopping assistant. The GenAI assistant was designed to bypass traditional keyword search by offering conversational, hyper-personalized planning and product recommendations.

==== Marty AI ====
Marty is AI "super agent," designed to help advertisers and sellers simplify campaigns, manage ad setups, and gain personalized performance insights.

==== Code Puppy ====
Code Puppy is an open-source, AI-powered coding agent initially developed internally which was first created and released as an open-source tool in 2025. It functions as a "vibe-coding" assistant designed to let users generate code, build automations, and deploy applications using natural language. it was built as a lightweight, open-source alternative to commercial IDEs like Cursor and Windsurf.

== Corporate organization and leadership ==
The head of the Global Tech is the Global Chief Technology Officer (CTO), and Chief Development Officer of Walmart Inc..

The Global Tech associates are based in US, India, Mexico, Costa Rica and Israel.

In May 2026, there was a major organizational overhaul designed to streamline operations by merging the company's global technology, product, design, and AI teams into a single, unified system across Walmart U.S., Sam's Club, and international divisions.

== Partnerships ==
=== United States ===
The Bentonville Institute of Technology is an upcoming STEM-focused independent university backed by the Walton family and built on the site of Walmart's former home office in Arkansas, which is designed to bridge the gap between education and industry. The university’s curriculum is built around AI, robotics, automation, and entrepreneurship.

=== India ===
In India, Walmart Global Tech has partnered with the Indian Institute of Technology Madras to accelerate research in new areas of technology and also with Indian Institute of Science to launch the Walmart Centre for Tech Excellence.

In September 2026, Walmart partnered with Indian Institute of Management Kozhikode to support India's deeptech startup ecosystem through mentorship, industry expertise and innovation-led collaboration. Later in 2026, a four year partnership was signed between Indian Institute of Technology Delhi and Walmart Tech for ₹9 crore (US$960,000) to advance research, education, and talent development in artificial intelligence, machine learning, and data science.

=== Technology ===
In 2025, Walmart partnered with OpenAI to create an AI-First shopping experiences, starting with allowing customers and members to soon shop Walmart through ChatGPT using Instant Checkout. In March 2026, Walmart discontinued the exclusive "Instant Checkout" feature within ChatGPT.

In January 2026, Walmart partnered with Google have come to a partnership for a strategic collaboration to launch an "agent-led commerce" experience that integrates Walmart and Sam's Club products directly into the Google Gemini app. The partnership transforms the AI chatbot into an end-to-end virtual shopping assistant.
