= G. K. Ananthasuresh =

Indian mechanical engineer and Professor (born 1967)

Gondi Kondaiah Ananthasuresh
- Born: 30 May 1967 (age 59); Singanamala, Andhra Pradesh, India
- Awards: Shanti Swarup Bhatnagar Prize for Science and Technology
- Scientific career
- Fields: Mechanical Engineering.
- Doctoral advisor: Sridhar Kota

Gondi Kondaiah Ananthasuresh is an Indian mechanical engineer and Professor at the Department of Mechanical Engineering, Indian Institute of Science, Bengaluru, India. He is best known for his work in the areas of Topology optimization, Compliant mechanism and Micro-Electro-Mechanical Systems (MEMS).

He is currently serving as the Divisional Dean of Mechanical Science at Indian Institute of Science. He was formerly the chairman of Centre of Biosystems Sciences and Engineering (BSSE) and Mechanical Engineering (ME) at Indian Institute of Science.

He is the recipient of Shanti Swarup Bhatnagar Award in 2010 for Engineering Sciences.

== Biography ==
Ananthasuresh did his B.Tech in Mechanical engineering from IIT Madras and obtained MS in Mechanical engineering from University of Toledo in the years 1989 and 1991, respectively. He received his PhD degree in Mechanical engineering in 1994 from University of Michigan. He was a Post-doc at Massachusetts Institute of Technology. Before moving to India, he was faculty at University of Pennsylvania from 1996 to 2004.

Currently, he heads the Multidisciplinary and Multi-scale Device and Design Lab (M2D2) at Indian Institute of Science, Bengaluru. He has advised 18 PhD students and 30 master's students so far.

== See also ==
- Topology optimization
- Compliant mechanism
