= Shashi Nambisan =

Shashi Nambisan is currently a professor at the University of Nevada Las Vegas. He has held various positions previously such as the director of the Center for Transportation Research and Education at Iowa State University, United States, where he was also a professor in the Department of Civil, Construction, and Environmental Engineering and director of the Las Vegas Transportation Research Center at the University of Nevada, Las Vegas where he worked for 18 years. He worked on traffic safety and made contributions to road safety in Nevada. His services were recognized by the Governor of Nevada, who proclaimed January 31, 2007, as Professor Shashi Nambisan Day. He was awarded the Harry Reid Silver State Research award in 2005.

Nambisan graduated from the Indian Institute of Technology, in Madras (now Chennai), India, with a B.Tech. degree in civil engineering in 1984. He got his Masters from Virginia Tech. He received his Ph.D. in civil engineering from the University of California, Berkeley. His areas of research interests are Transportation Safety and Risk Analysis, Development of Decision Support Tools, Transportation Planning and Infrastructure Management and Air Transportation.
