= Mobissimo =

Travel metasearch engine

- Company type: Privately held company
- Website type: Travel Metasearch engine
- Available in: English (US, UK, Indian), French, German, Italian, Polish, Spanish, Indian, Japanese, Portuguese (BR)
- Founded: 2004; 22 years ago
- Headquarters: San Francisco, California, {{{location_country}}}
- Area served: Worldwide
- Founders: Béatrice Tarka; Lucia Carniglia Svetlozar Nestorov
- Industry: Travel, Internet
- Revenue: Private
- Employees: 10 (2010)
- Website: www.mobissimo.com
- Registration: Optional
- Launched: January 1st, 2004

Mobissimo was a travel metasearch engine website based in San Francisco, California. It allows consumers to compare prices on flights, hotels, and car rentals. The company offers country-specific websites in North America, Brazil, Mexico, France, Italy, Poland, Spain, Germany, the UK, India and Japan.

== History ==
The site was founded in 2004 with $1 million of seed money from Benhamou Global Ventures, Cambrian Ventures and Index Ventures.

== Recognition ==
- In 2010, the Chicago Tribune quoted it as one of the “3 Leading Search Engines” for travel.
- TechCrunch said it would “out execute” Kayak.com.
