= Association for India's Development =

Association for India's Development (AID)
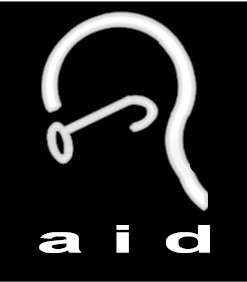
- AID logo
- Formation: 1991
- Founder: Ravi Kuchimanchi
- Type: Volunteer movement
- Legal status: Charity
- Purpose: Sustainable, Equitable and Just Development in the Republic of India
- Region served: India
- Main organ: Board of directors
- Website: www.aidindia.org

The Association for India's Development, Inc. (AID) is a secular charity organization based in the United States which promotes "sustainable, equitable and just development". AID has won several awards for its work, including the 'Global Impact Award' by the prominent newspaper 'The Times of India'.

== Activities ==
AID supports grassroots organizations in India, interconnected spheres such as educations, livelihoods, natural resources including land, water and energy, agriculture, health, women's empowerment and social justice. AID focuses on a rights-based approach and is in solidarity with prominent people's movements and social workers of India. AID promotes Gandhi ji's ideas of "being the change that you wish to see in the world" inspiring people to support fair trades, organic products, question injustices and decreases their ecological footprints. AID works towards Ambedkar's vision of equality for all enshrined in India's Constitution.

== Organization in the United States ==
AID consists of a decentralized network of chapters which raise and utilize funds independently. There were 36 chapters in 2010 with a total volunteer strength of around 1000. The major activities of the U.S. chapters are raising funds, reviewing and supporting projects in India and informing and mobilizing their communities about important social and developmental issues in India. There were about 100 projects actively supported by AID chapters in 2010.

== Jeevansaathis ==
The Jeevansaathi program began in 1998 to enable and encourage AID volunteers to engage in full-time social works. AID Jeevansaathis make a commitment to work on development issues, being part of AID's network and opening up new directions for AID to explore. Only AID volunteers are eligible to become Jeevansathis. Currently AID has seven Jeevansaathis.
