= IIT Madras =

Research Institute in Chennai, Tamil Nadu, India

Indian Institute of Technology Madras
- Emblem of the IIT Madras
- Motto: सिद्धिर्भवति कर्मजा (Sanskrit)
- Motto in English: "Success is born out of action"
- Type: Public research university
- Established: 1959; 67 years ago
- Accreditation: NAAC
- Endowment: ₹700 crore (2021) (US$ 93.26 million)
- Budget: ₹996 crore (US$100 million) (2021–2022)
- Chairman: Pawan Kumar Goenka
- Director: V. Kamakoti
- Academic staff: 674
- Students: 10,238
- Undergraduates: 4,909
- Postgraduates: 2,488
- Doctoral students: 2,841
- Location: Chennai, Tamil Nadu, 600036, India; 12.99151°N 80.23362°E
- Campus: Urban 620 acres (2.5 km^{2})
- Colors: Maroon Gold
- Website: IIT Madras

Main gate facade of IIT Madras

The Indian Institute of Technology Madras (IIT-Madras or IIT-M) is a public research university and technical institute located in Chennai, Tamil Nadu, India. It is recognized as an Institute of Eminence. It has also ranked first nationally in engineering and overall categories by the National Institutional Ranking Framework (NIRF) for many years.

As an Indian Institute of Technology, IIT Madras is also recognized as an Institute of National Importance by the Government of India. Founded in 1959 with technical, academic and financial assistance from the government of West Germany, IITM was the third Indian Institute of Technology to be established.

== History ==
In 1956, the West German Government rendered technical assistance to establish a state-of-the-art engineering institute in India. Soon, the first Indo-German agreement was signed in Bonn, West Germany, in 1959 for the establishment of the Indian Institute of Technology in Madras (now Chennai). IIT Madras was started with technical, academic and financial assistance from the Government of West Germany. It was at the time the most significant international educational project sponsored by the Federal Republic of Germany. As part of the agreement, the West German government committed to providing various forms of assistance for the development of the institute in Madras:

- A workshop, laboratory equipment, and a library whose total value does not exceed ₹1.8 crore (equivalent to ₹166 crores or $20 million in 2024) .
- Twenty German professors to serve at the institute for a period of four to five years
- Four German foremen for the workshops of the institute for two years
- Facilities for the training of twenty Indian teachers in German institutions

This has led to several collaborative research efforts with universities and institutions in Germany over the years. Although official support from the German government has ended, several research efforts involving the DAAD programme and Humboldt Fellowships still exist.

The Indian Institute of Technology, Madras started functioning with the first batch of 120 students being admitted in July 1959 to the first year of the Engineering Course. The institute was inaugurated in 1959, by the then Union Minister for Scientific Research and Cultural Affairs. The first batch had an overall strength of 120 students from across India. In 1961, the IITs were declared to be Institutes of National Importance. The first convocation ceremony was held on 11 July 1964, with Dr. S. Radhakrishnan, then the president of India, delivering the convocation address and awarding the degrees to the inaugural batch of students. The institute got its first women students in the BTech batch of 1966. IIT Madras celebrated its Golden Jubilee in 2009, and its Diamond Jubilee in 2019.

== Campus ==
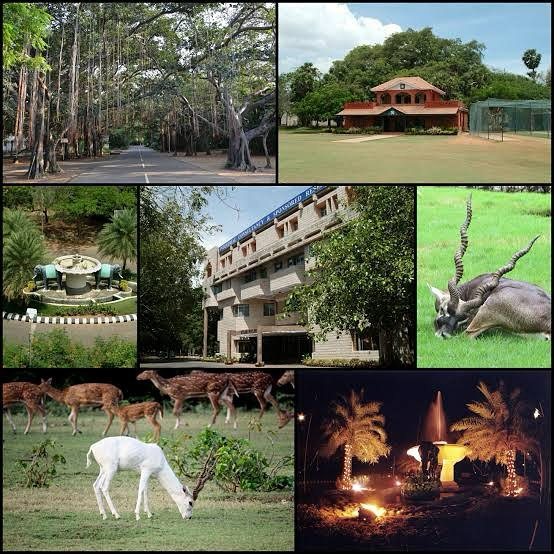
A collage showing the biodiversity and architectural landmarks within the IIT Madras campus, including banyan trees, albino blackbuck, deer, Gajendra Circle, and the Chemplast Cricket Ground.

The main entrance of IIT Madras is on Sardar Patel Road, flanked by the residential districts of Adyar and Velachery. The campus is close to the Raj Bhavan, the official residence of the Governor of Tamil Nadu. Other entrances are located in Velachery (near Anna Garden MTC bus stop, Velachery Main Road), Gandhi Road and Taramani gate (close to Ascendas Tech Park).

Two parallel roads, Bonn Avenue and Delhi Avenue, cut through the faculty residential area before they meet at the Gajendra Circle, near the Administrative Block. Buses regularly ply between the Main Gate, Gajendra Circle, the Academic Zone, and the Hostel Zone.

=== Student hostels ===
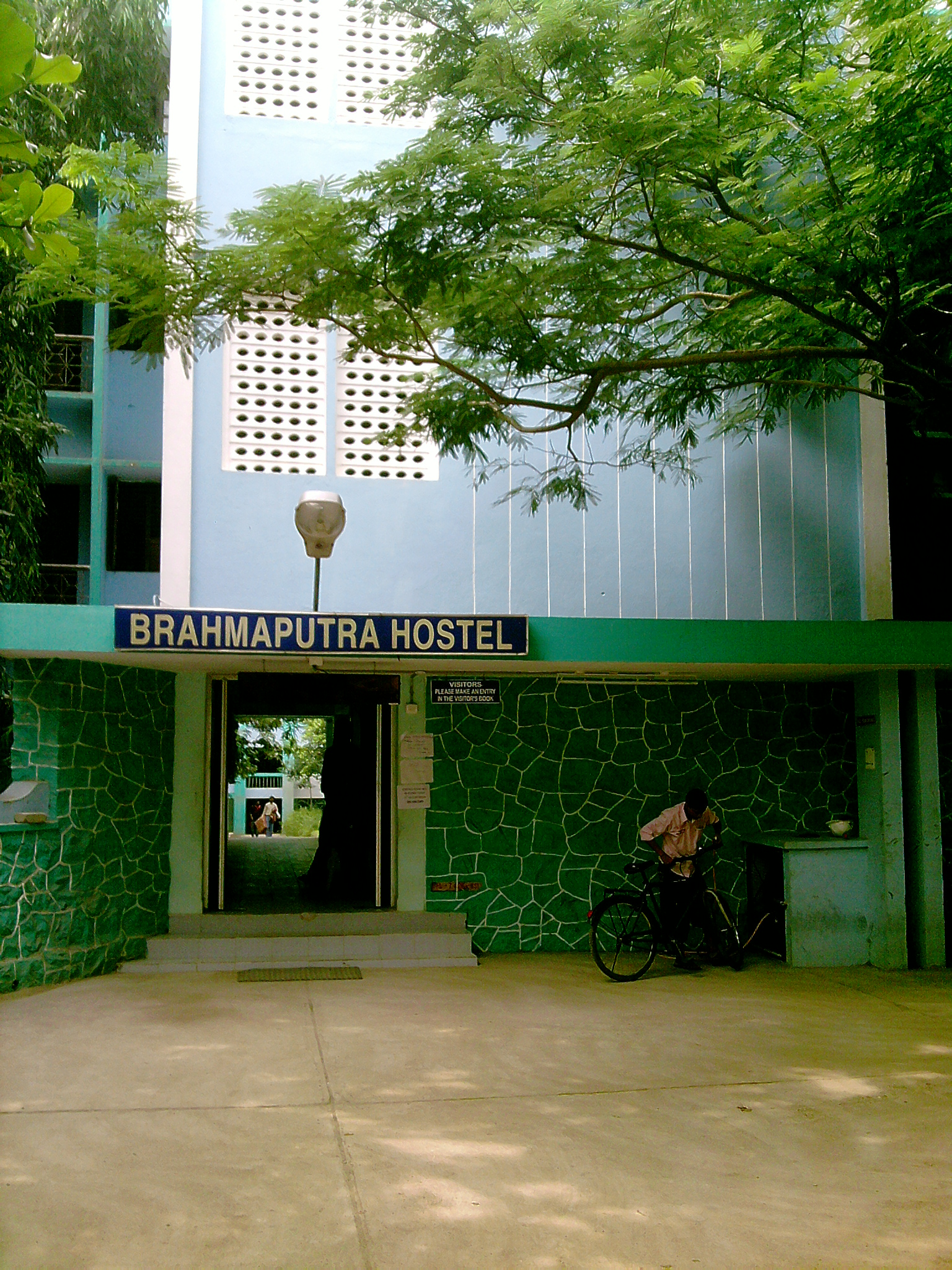
Brahmaputra Hostel

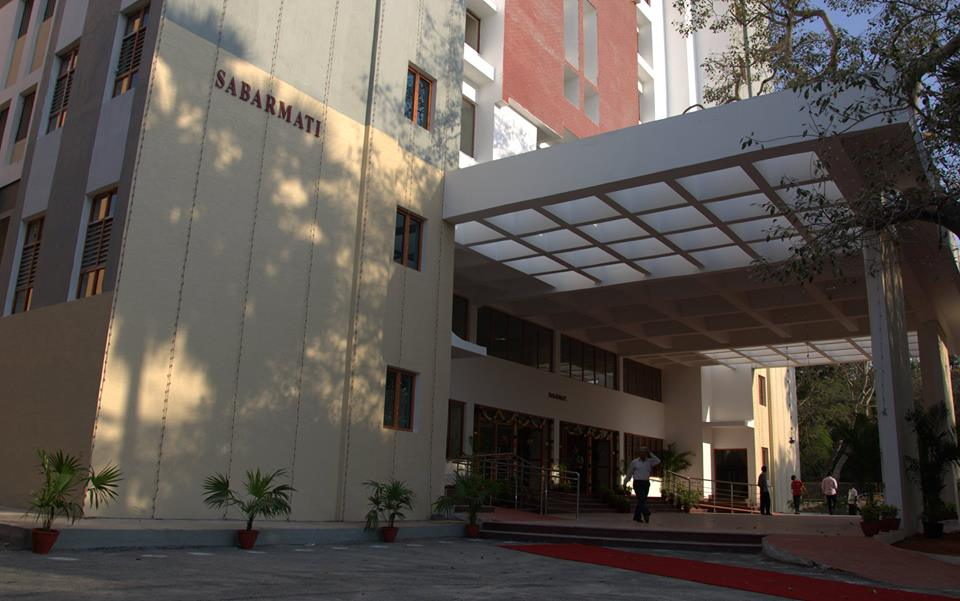
Sabarmati Hostel

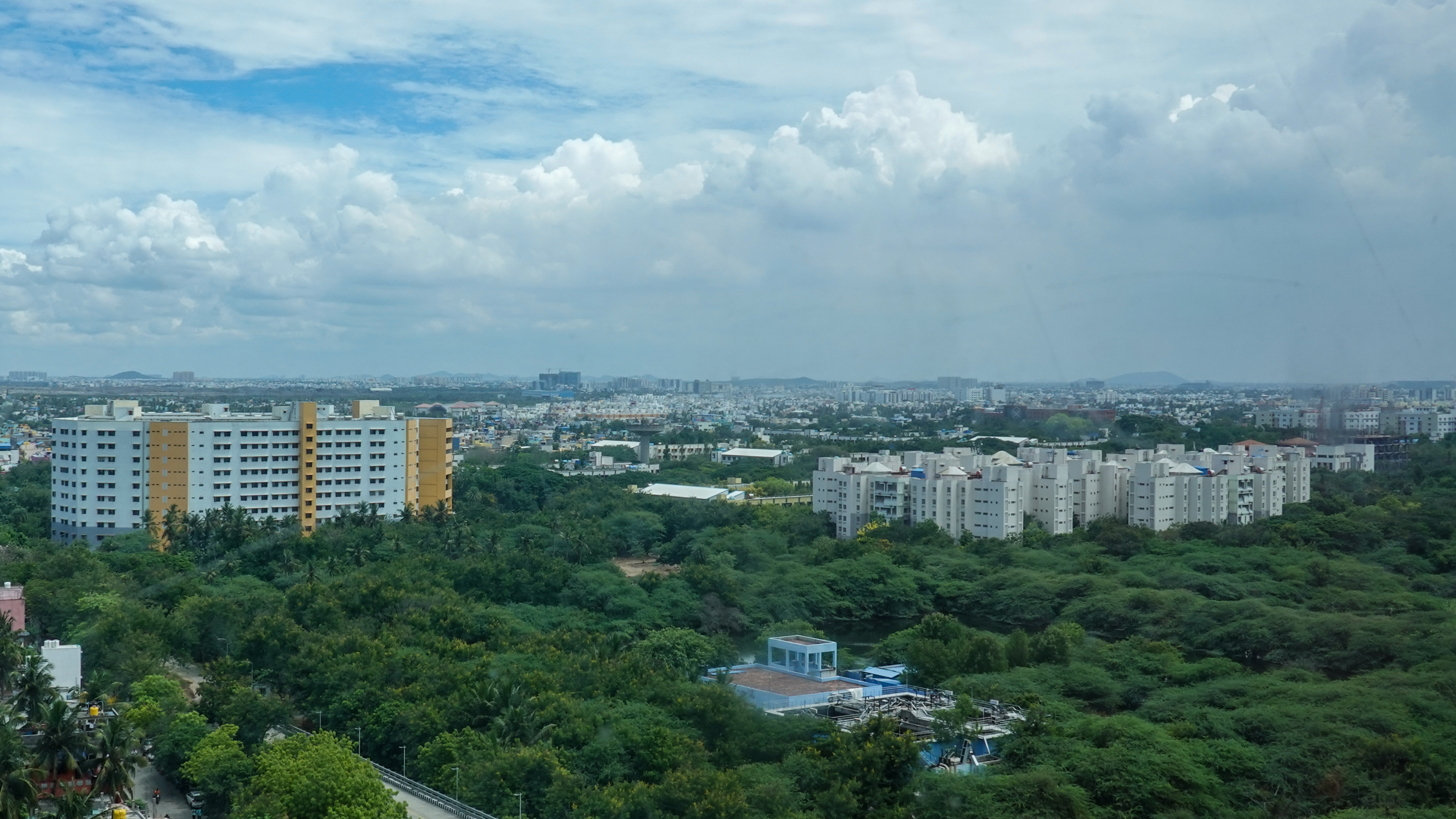
High-rise hostels: Mandakini (left), Mahanadi and Tamiraparani (right)

Most students at IIT Madras reside in student hostels, where extracurricular activities complement the academic routine. The campus has 21 hostels, of which six —Sabarmati, Sarayu, Sharavati, Swarnamukhi, and the convertible Tunga-Bhadra—are currently exclusively for women. In earlier times, each hostel had attached dining facilities, but all of them have been closed down starting around 2010. Dining facilities are provided in three centralised halls: Nilgiri, Vindhya and Himalaya. Recently (2023), a new mess has been opened in the old Cauvery hostel mess for Jain food. Students are assigned to hostels upon matriculation, where they usually reside for the entire duration of their course of study.

The hostels of IITM are:

Boys' hostels
Alakananda	Brahmaputra	Cauvery	Ganga
Godavari	Jamuna	Krishna	Mahanadhi
Mandakini	Narmada	Pampa	Saraswathi
Sindhu	Tamiraparani	Tapti	
Girls' hostels
Bhadra	Sabarmati	Sarayu	Sharavathi
Swarnamukhi	Tunga		

Mandakini is nine storeyed, Sindhu, Pampa, Mahanadhi and Tamiraparani are seven-storeyed, whereas all the other hostels are three or four-storeyed. The latter four hostels can accommodate more than 1,200 students. The older hostels were all three-storeyed till the early 2000s, when extra rooms were added. An additional new floor in the three-storeyed hostels, which generally house the undergraduate students, and a new block in place of the mess halls of these hostels have been constructed to accommodate the increased intake of students. These new blocks could be used as entrances for these hostels. As of 2022, the old Mandakini has been demolished and a new multi-storey block opened, with provision to accommodate approximately 1200 students.

=== Facilities ===
IIT Madras provides residential accommodation for its students, faculty, administrative and supporting staff, and their families. The residential houses employ private caterers. The self-contained campus includes two schools (Vanavani and Kendriya Vidyalaya), three temples (Jalakanteshwara, Durga Peliamman and Ganapathi), three bank branches (SBI, ICICI, Canara Bank), a hospital, shopping centres, food shops, a gym, sleeping room and cricket, football, hockey and badminton stadiums.

IIT Madras also has supercomputing capability, with the IBM Virgo Super Cluster with 97 teraflops worth of computational power.

=== Satellite campuses ===
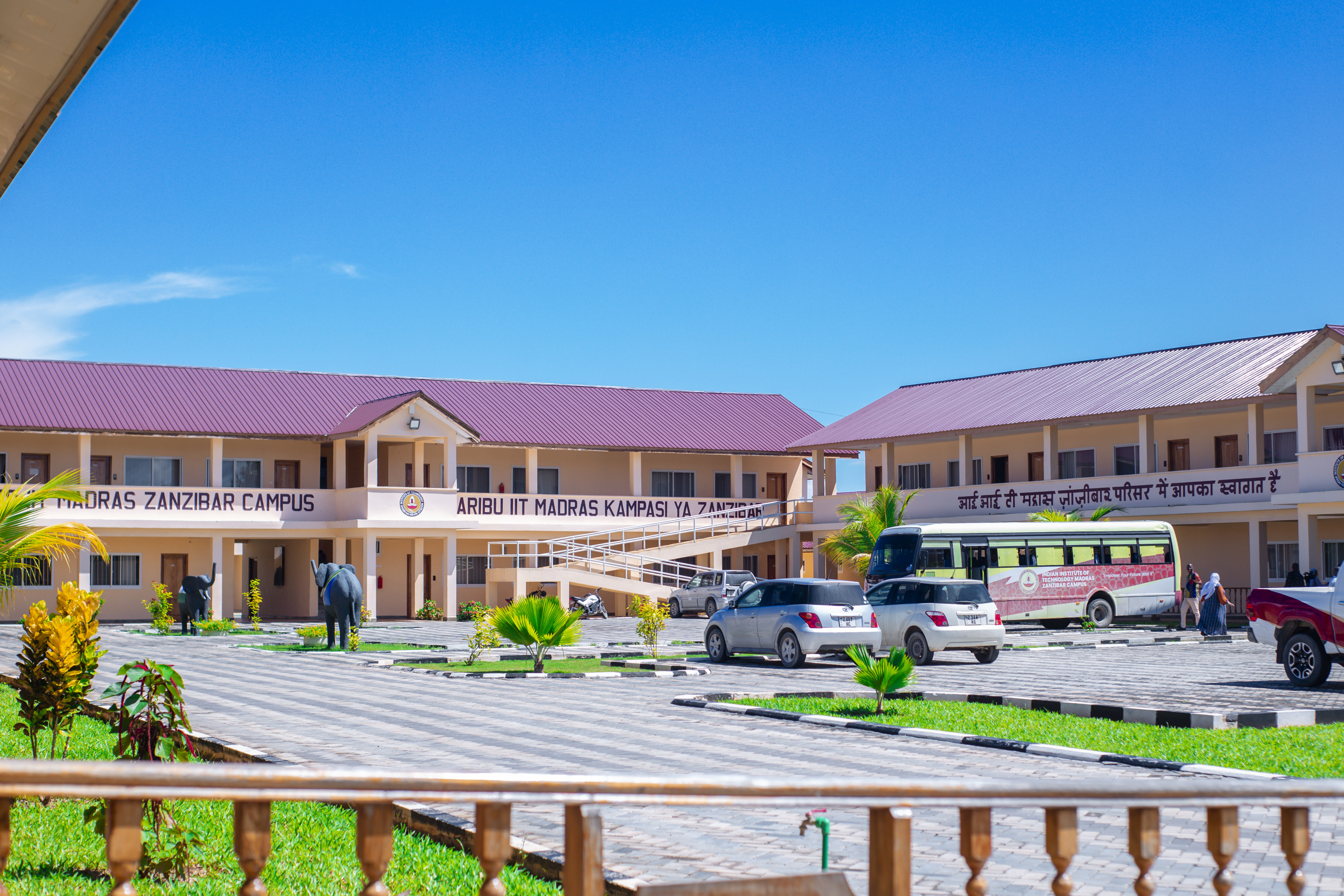
IIT Madras Zanzibar's temporary campus, located in Bweleo, South of Zanzibar City.

Following the long discussion to setup an offshore campus by the IITs, IIT Madras became the first to establish its campus in Zanzibar, Tanzania. A Memorandum of Understanding (MoU) was signed between the Ministry of Education (MoE), Government of India, IIT Madras and Ministry of Education and Vocational Training (MoEVT) Zanzibar-Tanzania on 5 July 2023, in the presence of Dr. Hussein Ali Mwinyi, President of Zanzibar and Dr. S. Jaishankar, External Affairs Minister of India.

It was announced that classes would be starting from October same year, from a temporary campus in Bweleo, Urban West in Zanzibar. The first batch started with 50 students in BS and 15 students in MTech in Data science and AI programmes. In an interview in 2024, director of IITMZ, Prof. Preeti Aghalayam, first female director of IIT, signalled that the institute could move into a 225-acre permanent campus by 2025.

In April 2017, IIT Madras secured 163 acres of land from the Government of Tamil Nadu for establishing additional research facilities. The land is located at Thaiyur 'B' village, Thiruporur Taluk, Chengalpattu District, Tamil Nadu and named as IITM Discovery campus. Hon'ble Prime Minister Shri Narendra Modi Inaugurated IIT Madras 'Discovery Campus'.

Discovery campus houses national important research facility Port center by NTCPWC consisting Asia's largest shallow wave basin to cater to research and industry requirements and some startups such as ePlane, Agnikul, Hyperloop etc.

== Organisation and administration ==
=== Governance ===
IIT Madras is an autonomous statutory organisation functioning within the Institutes of Technology Act. The twenty-three IITs are administered centrally by the IIT Council, an apex body established by the Government of India. The Minister of Human Resources and Development is the chairman of the council. Each institute has a board of governors responsible for its administration and control. The finance committee advises on matters of financial policy, while the Building and Works Committee advises on buildings and infrastructure.

The Senate comprises all professors of the institute and decides its academic policy. It controls and approves the curriculum, courses, examinations, and results. It appoints committees to examine specific academic matters. The director of the institute serves as the chairman of the Senate. The current director (appointed in 2022) is Kamakoti Veezhinathan, who obtained his Ph.D. and M.S in CSE from IIT Madras. He was conferred the Padma Shri award in 2026 January.

Three Senate Sub-Committees – The Board of Academic Research, The Board of Academic Courses and The Board of Students – help in academic administration and the operations of the institute. The Board of Industrial Consultancy and Sponsored Research addresses industrial consultancy, and the Library Advisory Committee oversees library matters.

== Departments ==
IIT Madras has the following departments

- Aerospace Engineering
- Applied Mechanics and Biomedical Engineering
- Biotechnology (Bhupat and Jyoti Mehta School of Biosciences)
- Chemical Engineering
- Chemistry
- Civil Engineering
- Computer Science and Engineering (CSE)
- Data Science and Artificial Intelligence
- Electrical Engineering (EE)
- Engineering Design
- Humanities and Social Sciences (HSS)
- Management Studies (DoMS)
- Mathematics (MA)
- Mechanical Engineering (ME)
- Medical Science and Technology (MST)
- Metallurgical and Materials Engineering
- Ocean Engineering
- Physics

== Academics ==
IIT Madras offers undergraduate, postgraduate and research degrees across 18 disciplines in Engineering, Science, Humanities and Management. About 600 faculty belonging to science and engineering departments and centres of the institute are engaged in teaching, research and industrial consultancy.

The institute has 18 academic departments and advanced research centres across disciplines of engineering and pure sciences, with nearly 100 laboratories. The academic calendar is organised around the semester. Each semester provides a minimum of seventy days of instruction in English. Students are evaluated continuously throughout the semester. The faculty does evaluation, a consequence of the autonomous status granted to the institute. Research work is evaluated based on the review thesis by peer examiners, both from within the country and abroad. The Senate, the highest academic body within the institute prepare ordinances that govern the academic programme of study.

IITM is also gearing up to launch a new and completely online BEd degree programme in Maths and Computing to improve maths teaching in schools, as said by the director at the G20 seminar at IIT Madras.

=== Admission tests ===
For the undergraduate curriculum, admission to the BTech and Dual Degree (BS + MS or BTech + MTech) programme is done through the Joint Entrance Examination – Advanced (JEE-Advanced). IIT Madras was the organising institute of JEE Advanced in 2017 and 2024.

However, admissions to the BS Chemistry and BS Medical Sciences and Engineering (MSE) courses are not done through JEE Advanced but are done from a separate merit list made based on the rank obtained in IAT, upon separate registration on the IITM website.

Admissions to the 4-years hybrid BS degree programmes for Data Science and Applications and Electronic Systems are taken through 2 channels: JEE-based entry (students clearing cutoff of JEE(Main) to be eligible to write JEE(Advanced) are eligible for direct entry to this course); Regular Entry through Qualifier Exam which is their entrance test, any student from any background and even professionals can sit in this test.

In 2025, IIT Madras introduced a new admission process for undergraduate programs, allowing students who have excelled in national and international Olympiads to secure seats without a JEE score. Moreover, they have also introduced a sports quota and fine arts and cultural excellence quota through which a candidate with national level achievements in various sports and cultural fields can apply for admission, after having qualified for JEE advanced.

For the postgraduate curriculum, admission to the MTech and MS programmes are through the Graduate Aptitude Test in Engineering (GATE); after 2022, with the discontinuation of 5-year integrated MA program and the same becoming a 2-year PG program, admissions is through GATE for the MA program also. The Joint Admission Test to MSc (JAM) is the entrance exam for the two-year MSc programme, and other post BSc programmes. MBA candidates are accepted through the Common Admission Test (CAT).

=== Academic research programmes ===
The institute has departments and advanced research centres across the disciplines of engineering and the pure sciences, and nearly 100 laboratories.

Research programmes concern work undertaken by faculty members or specific research groups within departments that award an MS or PhD degree. Research is carried out by scholars admitted into these departmental programmes, under the guidance of their faculty. Each department makes known its areas of interest to the academic community through handbooks, brochures and bulletins. Topics of interest may be theoretical or experimental. IIT Madras has initiated 16 interdisciplinary research projects against identified focus areas.

=== Partnership with other universities ===
The institute maintains academic friendships with educational institutes around the world through faculty exchange programmes. The institute has signed Memoranda of Understanding (MoUs) with foreign universities, resulting in cooperative projects and assignments.

== Rankings ==
IIT Madras was ranked 170th in the QS World University Rankings 2027, an improvement of ten places from the previous year.

University and college rankings

General – international
- ARWU (2022): 701–800

General – India
- NIRF (Overall) (2024): 1
- NIRF (Research) (2024): 2

Engineering – India
- NIRF (2024): 1
- Government colleges
- Outlook India (2022): 2

Business/Management – India
- NIRF (2024): 16

Internationally, IIT Madras was ranked 170th in the QS World University Rankings 2027. It was ranked 701–800 in the world by the Academic Ranking of World Universities of 2022.

IIT Madras was ranked 1st in the overall category for the 7th consecutive year, 2nd among research institutions, and 1st among engineering colleges for the 10th consecutive year by the National Institutional Ranking Framework (NIRF) in 2025. It also secured the 1st rank in the Innovation and Sustainability Development Goals (SDG) categories in NIRF 2025.

IIT Madras BS in Data Science won Silver in the Wharton (University of Pennsylvania) – QS Reimagine Education Awards.

== Research ==
=== Industrial Consultancy ===
Through industrial consultancy, faculty and staff undertake industry assignments that may include project design, testing and evaluation, or training in new areas of industrial development. Industries and organisations like the Indian Ordnance Factories

=== National Programme on Technology Enhanced Learning (NPTEL) ===
To improve the quality of higher education in India, IIT Madras came up with an initiative called NPTEL (National Programme on Technology Enhanced Learning) in the year 2003. As per this initiative, all the IITs, along with the IISc Bangalore would come up with a series of video lecture-based courses across all the streams of engineering.

=== IITM Research Park ===
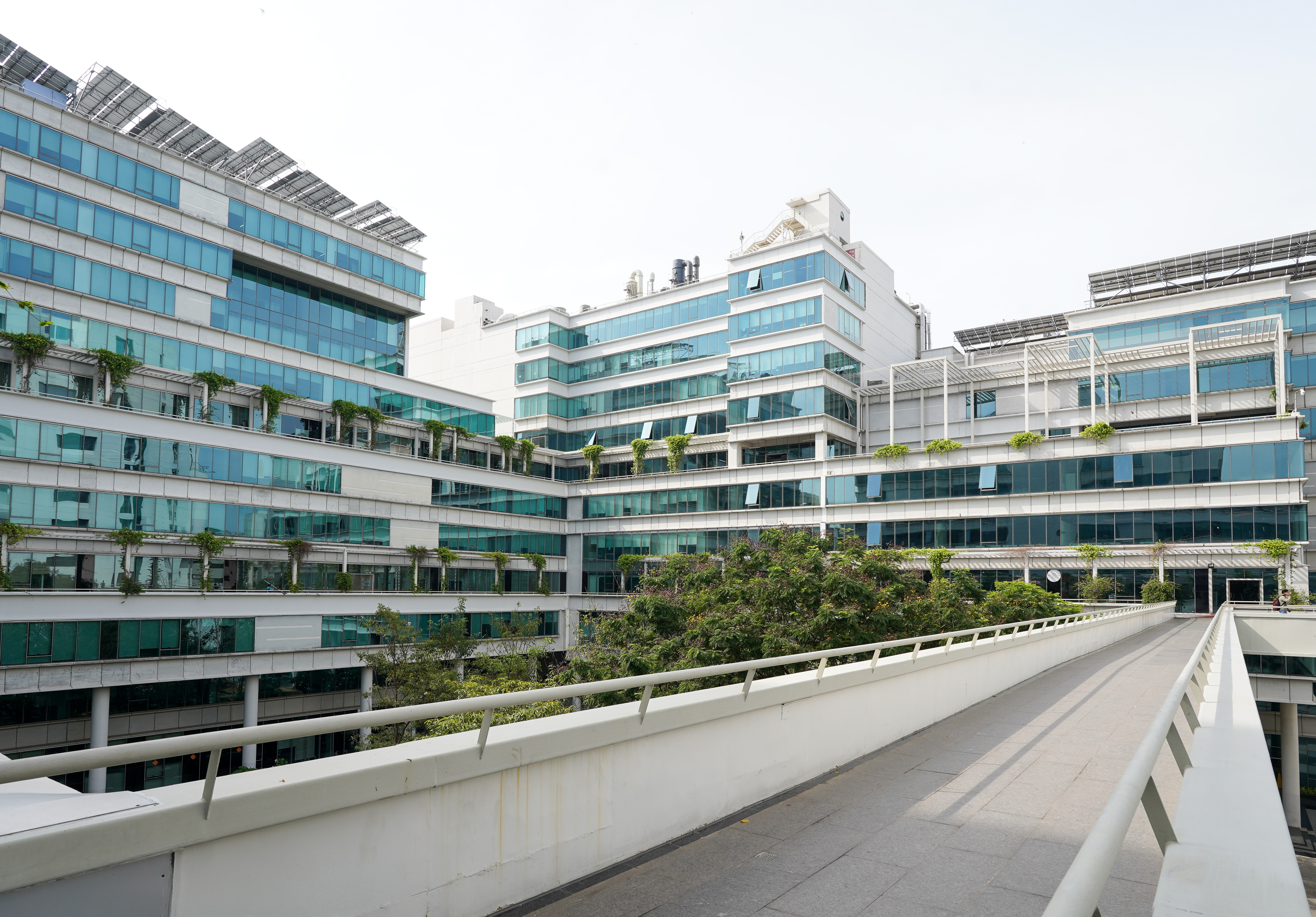
Walkway between blocks of the Research Park

IITM Research Park is India's first university-based research park. The Research Park functions to promote innovation in established companies and provide a nurturing ecosystem to startups through incubation efforts and technical infrastructure. Following its success, 50 research parks were planned as part of the Start Up India initiative of the Central Government of India. Corporate clients of IIT Madras Research Park include the Defence Research and Development Organisation (DRDO), Bharat Heavy Electricals Limited, Saint-Gobain and Forbes Marshall. Ather Energy, Hyperverge, Gyandata and Healthcare Technology Innovation Centre(Sponsored by Department of Biotechnology, Government of India) are some of the startups and centres incubated at the Research Park. The Research Park is a prime driver for the huge number of startups incubated at IIT Madras.

=== Pravartak ===
IITM Pravartak is funded by the Department of Science and Technology, GOI, under its National Mission on Interdisciplinary Cyber-Physical Systems, and it's hosted as a Technology Innovation Hub (TIH) by IIT Madras. It focuses on Technology, Entrepreneurship and Human Resource skill development through various initiatives. It provides hands-on programmes, and hybrid courses like Out of the Box Thinking in Maths, Winter School on Advanced Quantum Computing, Wireless Networks, Blockchains and others.

=== Bharat Semiconductor Research Centre ===
On 20 October 2023, the Ministry of Electronics and Information Technology stated that the Bharat Semiconductor Research Centre (BSRC) would be established starting in 2024, working with professionals from the industry and academic institutions. Rajeev Chandrashekhar states that BSRC will function as the Indian counterpart of the MIT Microelectronics Laboratory, Alan G. MacDiarmid NanoTech Institute, Industrial Technology Research Institute, and IMEC. The Bharat Semiconductor Research Centre will be located at IIT Madras. The centre will be established initially as an institution co-located with Semi-Conductor Laboratory, with the potential to split off into a stand-alone semiconductor research organization in the future.

== Alumni and corporate relations ==
=== Initiatives and engagement ===
The Office of Alumni and Corporate Relations initiates, promotes, and facilitates connections among the diverse network of IIT Madras alumni as well as corporations. Through collaborations, mentorship programs, and knowledge-sharing initiatives, the office contributes to the institute's progress and goals. The office fosters alumni engagement with the institute through various initiatives such as organising reunions across batches, recognising distinguished alumni, and ensuring that alumni stay in touch with developments at IIT Madras through newsletters and regular communications. Prof. Mahesh Panchagnula currently heads it from the Dept of Applied Mechanics, IIT Madras.

=== Collaborations with corporations ===
The office has facilitated various technology-driven social impact collaborations with various corporations and corporate foundation arms, under Corporate Social Responsibility (CSR) in India. Partnerships with both Alumni and corporations are undertaken through the Office of Institutional Advancement, which functions as part of the Alumni and Corporate Relations office.

== Modern and advanced courses ==
=== BS Degree in Data Science and Applications ===
The institute launched a 4-year non-campus UG Bachelor of Science degree (BS) program in Data Science and Applications in 2020 with unique flexible exit options as per the NEP, which was earlier a non-campus 3-year BSc degree programme in Programming and Data Science. The 142-credit program consists of three levels — Foundation (32 credits), Diploma (54 credits), and Degree (56 credits), and a total of 34 theory courses and four project courses. The degree programme is currently being run in a hybrid mode, with content delivery in online mode and assessments done through monthly in-person exams conducted at centres.

Notable faculties from the foundation level of the program include Dr. Madhavan Mukund (Director, Chennai Mathematical Institute), Dr. Rajesh Kumar (Professor, Department of Humanities and Social Sciences, IIT Madras), Dr. Andrew Thangaraj (Professor, Electrical Engineering Department, IIT Madras), and Sudarshan Iyengar (Associate Professor & HOD, Department of Computer Science and Engineering, IIT Ropar).

The program follows a trimester academic system, with the academic year divided into three terms of four months each: January–April (Winter), May–August (Spring) and September–December (Fall). It admits students three times a year and is open to students from all academic backgrounds and age groups. Students can receive income-based fee waivers each term, with special consideration for SC/ST/PwD students. Verizon India and L&T Technology Services provide scholarships to BS degree students.

==== Careers and alumni outcomes ====
Graduates of the programme have been placed across industries including data analytics, financial technology, energy, healthcare technology, and engineering, at organisations such as Syngenta, Tata Communications, RNTBCI, Aditya Birla Group Data & Analytics, Symphony AI, KPI Partners, HP, United Airlines, and American Express, among others.

The programme has attracted students from diverse professional and academic backgrounds, including practising medical professionals, civil servants, and working engineers, with no restrictions based on age, profession, or prior academic stream, in line with the principles of the National Education Policy 2020. A student of the programme, Zohra Banu from the Andaman and Nicobar Islands, cleared the UPSC Civil Services Examination securing an All India Rank of 469.

Students of the programme have demonstrated strong performance in competitive examinations. In the Graduate Aptitude Test in Engineering (GATE) 2025, three students secured positions among the top 10 All India Ranks in the Data Science and AI paper, including All India Rank 1.

Several graduates have additionally proceeded to postgraduate and doctoral programmes at institutions of national importance including the Indian Institute of Science, IIT Delhi, IIT Bombay, IIT Madras, IIT Roorkee, IIT Gandhinagar, IIT Ropar, IIT Mandi, IIT Palakkad, IIT Hyderabad, and IIT Guwahati. Graduates have also pursued higher studies at universities abroad, including the University of Melbourne and the University of Edinburgh, among others.

Some graduates have pursued entrepreneurship, with startups founded by programme alumni incubated at the IIT Madras Research Park. These include Cosmic Soul AI, an IIT Madras-incubated deep-tech startup developing CPU-first sovereign AI infrastructure, which has been recognised as a finalist at Hello Tomorrow 2026 in the Advanced Computing and Cybersecurity track, and holds a DST NIDHI PRAYAS grant and [[Department for Promotion of Industry and Internal Trade|DPIIT]] recognition. The IIT Madras Incubation Cell (IITMIC) and its pre-incubation programme Nirmaan are open to students, alumni, and researchers across all IIT Madras programmes including the online BS degree.

==== Student life ====
The official IITM-approved societies and clubs for BS degree students include the Ramanujan Society for Research (RaSoR), Pravaha (Dance society), Anime Society, Adhyay (civil services society), Raahat (mental health and wellness society), Cosmos (Tech society), Erudite (Oratory society), Art Society, Sahityika (Literary society), Film Society, Heighters (esports club), WYZ Kids (Quiz club), Akord (Music society), Aayam (Drama society), and Shah Maat (Chess society).

Despite open eligibility with no JEE requirement, the programme maintains significant academic rigour through a qualifier examination and continuous assessments. As of 2026, the programme has over 42,000 active enrolled learners, while cumulative degree and diploma recipients across all convocations since inception number approximately 1,460, reflecting the demanding academic standards maintained by the programme. More than half of enrolled students are pursuing the programme simultaneously alongside another undergraduate degree, while approximately 14 per cent are working professionals.

=== BS Degree in Electronic Systems (ES) ===
IITM launched the 4-yr BS undergrad degree in Electronic Systems (ES) in March 2023 to meet the significant and growing demand for skilled graduates in the electronics and embedded systems sector in India. The faculty coordinators of this department include Dr. Aniruddhan and Dr. Boby George from the Department of Electrical Engineering at IITM.

Similar to the BS in DSA, this program follows a trimester curriculum, and is conducted in hybrid mode. Unique characteristic about ES, however, is in-person lab sessions, which allows students to visit campus for hands on experience. Criteria for credits required to graduate and flexible exit options remain same as DSA, keeping in line with NEP, 2020.

=== BS Degree in Management and Data Science ===
In February 2026, IIT Madras launched a Bachelor of Science in Management and Data Science, an interdisciplinary undergraduate programme offered by its Department of Management Studies (DoMS). The programme integrates business decision-making, quantitative thinking, and data-driven problem solving, with graduates receiving a BS degree carrying the same academic recognition as any other IIT Madras degree. The first batch commenced in June 2026. Admissions and academic delivery are coordinated through IIT Madras' Centre for Outreach and Digital Education (CODE). The programme is open to all Class 12 graduates with English and Mathematics, without requiring JEE, and follows a hybrid model with online content delivery and in-person examinations. Flexible exit options at the foundation, diploma, and degree levels are provided in line with the National Education Policy 2020.

=== BS Degree in Aeronautics and Space Technology ===
In February 2026, IIT Madras launched a Bachelor of Science in Aeronautics and Space Technology, offered fully online through the Centre for Outreach and Digital Education (CODE) in collaboration with the Department of Aerospace Engineering. The programme is designed to prepare graduates for roles in public sector undertakings, private aerospace companies, and engineering analysis firms, and is aligned with national priorities in aviation, unmanned aerial vehicles, and space manufacturing. The curriculum is organised across four areas: aerodynamics of aerospace vehicles; flight dynamics, orbital mechanics and controls; aerospace structural analysis; and gas turbine and rocket propulsion. The programme is open to Class 12 graduates with Physics and Mathematics, without requiring JEE. It offers three exit levels — a foundation certificate, a Diploma in Aeronautics, and the BS degree — consistent with the National Education Policy 2020. Fee waivers of up to 75% are available for eligible learners.

=== Diploma Courses at IITM ===
IITM also offers direct admission to the Diploma in Programming and the Diploma in Data Science as part of the multiple-entry multiple-exit scheme of the BS in Data Science and Applications. Students who have completed at least two years of an undergrad degree are eligible to sit for the DAD qualifier exam (duration: 3 hours for Diploma in Programming and 4 hours for that of Data Science), which serves as the direct entrance test for these diploma programmes. Students completing both diplomas can continue on in the BS track.

== Research Centres ==
=== Robert Bosch Centre for Data Science and AI (RBC DSAI) ===
The RBCDSAI was set up in 2017 with funding from the institute to encourage interdisciplinary research. In the last 5 years, it has grown to be the pre-eminent multidisciplinary research centre for Data Science and AI in India. It is one of the country's largest groups in network analytics and deep reinforcement learning.

=== Centre for Responsible AI ===
Google has granted IIT Madras $1 million for setting up India's first multidisciplinary Centre for Responsible AI, led by Prof. Balaraman Ravindran.

=== Centre for CyberSecurity Research (CyStar) ===
The Centre was set up in 2024 with the objectives of promoting research in the field of cybersecurity and protecting the national infrastructures from cyberattacks.

=== Center of Excellence in Fluid and Thermal Sciences ===
The Centre of Excellence in Fluid and Thermal Sciences was established at IIT Madras with the help of the Indian Space Research Organisation (ISRO), which provided seed money of ₹1.84 crore. In terms of spacecraft design, analysis, and testing of different parts as well as thermal management, it will serve as a nodal centre. The centre will be a critical ISRO research hub. The centre's advanced research initiatives will focus on cryo-tank thermodynamics, combustion instability in hybrid rockets, and spacecraft thermal management.

== Student activities ==
=== Festivals ===
==== E-Summit IIT Madras ====
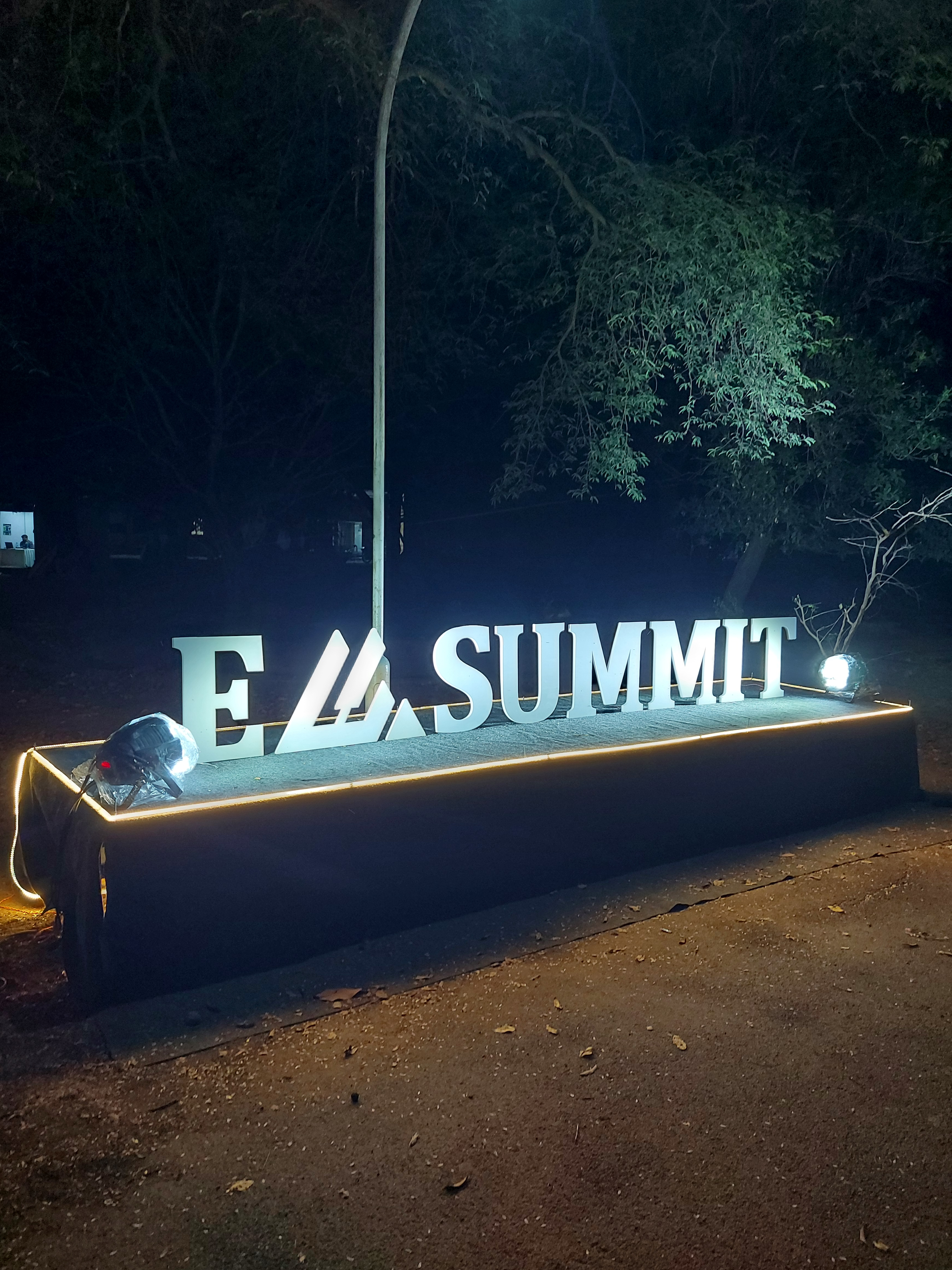

E-Summit by the Entrepreneurship Cell E-Cell of IIT Madras is IITM's annual flagship event and the only ISO 9001:2015 certified entrepreneurship summit focusing on young entrepreneurs and their ventures.

==== Shaastra ====
Shaastra is the annual technical festival of IIT Madras. It is held in the second week of January and is an ISO 9001:2015 certified student-organised festival. It consists of various engineering, science and technology competitions, summits, lectures, video conferences, exhibitions, demonstrations and workshops. The festival is traditionally held over four days and four nights during the first week of January. It has so far seen twenty-one editions, having started in its current avatar in the year 2000.

==== Saarang ====
Saarang is the annual social and cultural festival of IIT Madras. It is a five-day-long event held in early January every year and attracts a crowd of 70,000 students and young people from across the country, making it the largest student-run fest in India. Saarang events include speaking, dancing, thespian, quizzing and word games, professional shows (nicknamed Proshows) and workshops on music, fashion, art, and dance.

==== Paradox ====
Paradox is the fest organised for the IIT Madras Bachelor of Science degree students. It is held 3 times a year. Paradox in Saavan and Paradox in Margazhi are held hybrid around August and December respectively and consist of various cultural, sports, professional events, and hackathons. The main annual fest is held at the IITM campus. It's the largest physical gathering of IITM Online BS students that takes place in May every year, marking the start of the summer vacation for students.

==== Department festivals ====
Several departments organise department festivals. Samanvay, Biofest, ExeBit, Wavez, Mechanica, CEA Fest, ChemPlus, Amalgam and Forays are some of the festivals organised by the Department of Management Studies, Computer Science and Engineering, Ocean Engineering, Mechanical Engineering, Civil Engineering, Chemical Engineering, Metallurgical and Materials Engineering and Maths departments, respectively. Department of Humanities and Social Sciences hosts the Annual Academic Conference.

Fest name	Department
Aero fest	Aerospace Engineering
Amalgam	Metallurgical and Materials Engineering
ElecFest	Electrical Engineering
Samanvay	Department of Management Studies
Biofest	Biotechnology
ExeBit	Computer Science and Engineering
CEA Fest	Civil Engineering
Chemplus	Chemical Engineering
Forays	Mathematics
Mechanica	Mechanical Engineering
Wavez	Ocean Engineering
Annual Academic Conference	Humanities and Social Sciences
Bhoutics	Physics
CiHS	Chemistry

=== The Entrepreneurship Cell ===
The Entrepreneurship Cell at IIT Madras believes that entrepreneurship is not just about starting companies and building businesses, but a pathway towards India's socio-economic development. E-Cell was earlier known as C-TIDES and was rechristened in 2015 as the Entrepreneur.

E-Cell IIT Madras is an active non-profit, an entirely student-run organisation to help encourage entrepreneurship.

=== Centre For Innovation (CFI) ===
Set up with funds donated by the batch of 1981. CFI was started in 2008 as a student-run lab for the creative output of the budding engineers of IIT Madras. It provides students with the necessary platform for realizing their ideas. It houses 13 clubs and seven competition teams, representing IIT Madras in various technical events. Clubs have started summer School to teach freshers popular topics during the summer vacation.

CFI houses the workspace of student teams such as Avishkar Hyperloop, Raftar Formula Racing, Anveshak, Abhiyaan, Abhyuday, Agnirath and iGem.

The annual flagship event of CFI, the Open House displays the projects of all CFI clubs, along with the works of the Competitive Teams.

=== Extra Mural Lectures (EML) ===
Launched in 1980 by a group of students with support from the then director of IIT Madras, the late Prof. P.V. Indiresan, the main aim of the Extra Mural Lectures series is to expose the IIT Madras community to the ideas and experiences of eminent personalities from diverse backgrounds. Over the years, lectures included the late former president of India A.P.J. Abdul Kalam, Nobel Laureate The 14th Dalai Lama, Nobel Peace Laureate Kailash Satyarthi, Chess Grandmaster Vishwanathan Anand, filmmaker S.S. Rajamouli, Honourable Governor Shri. E.S.L. Narasimhan, Honourable Minister of Railways Shri. Suresh Prabhu, former vice president of India, Shri. M. Venkaiah Naidu, music composer Ilayaraja, co-founder of Infosys, Shri. Kris Gopalakrishnan, Ambassador of Japan to India H.E. Mr. Kenji Hiramatsu, then defence secretary of India Mr. Ajay Kumar (civil servant) and former ISRO chairman S. Somanath have been hosted at IIT Madras for Extra Mural Lectures, to motivate the students and broaden their perspectives.

=== Extracurricular Activities ===
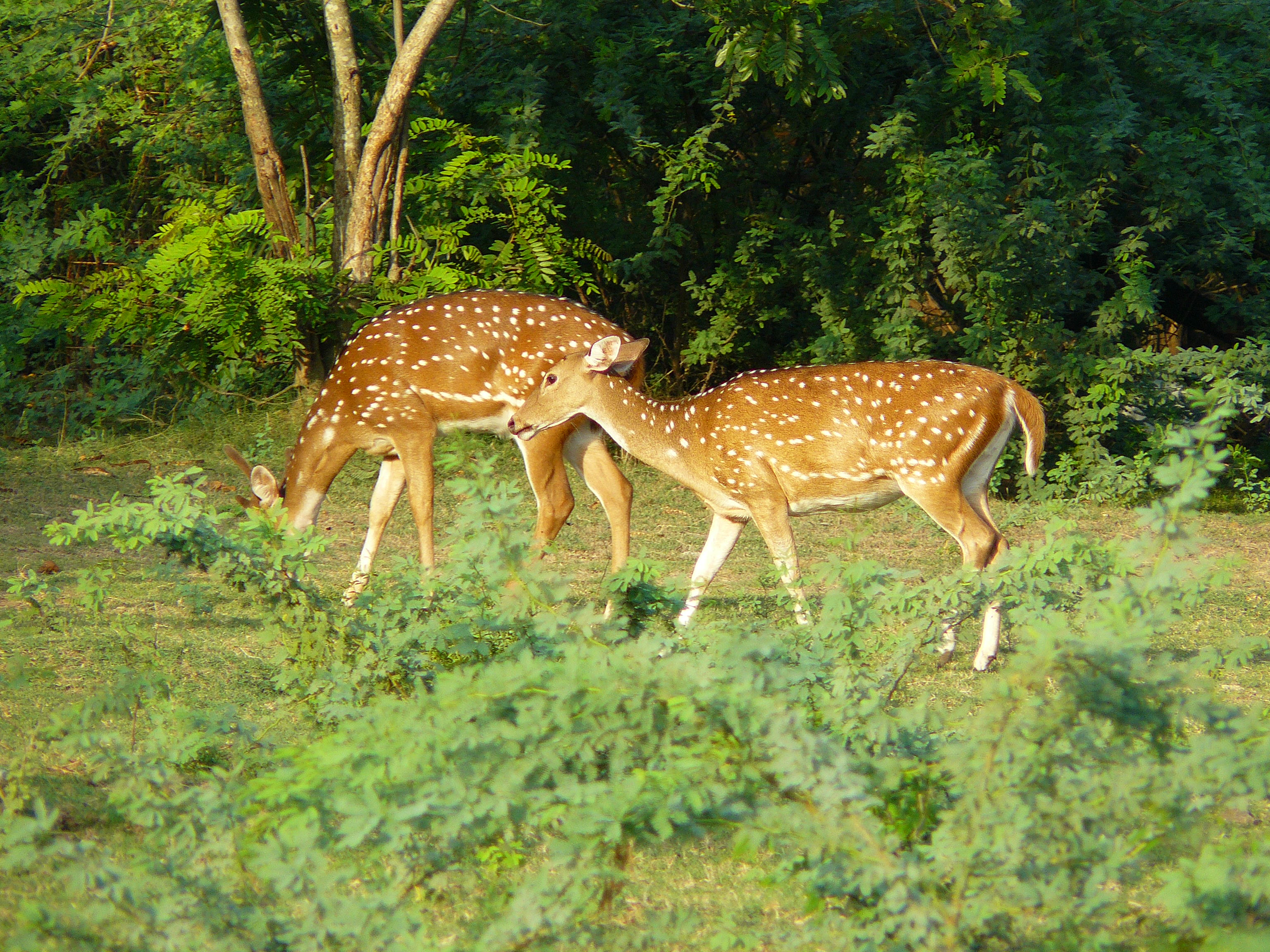
Deer at IIT Madras, in the open ground between SAC and the stadium

The Sustainability Network (S-Net) is an alumni-student-faculty initiative launched in May 2009 to help preserve the unique niche of one of the best educational campuses in India. S-Net was envisioned to work towards developing and deploying solutions for making a self-sustaining campus (focusing on energy/electricity, water, and waste management), which could eventually be replicated across the country through tie-ups with other educational institutions.

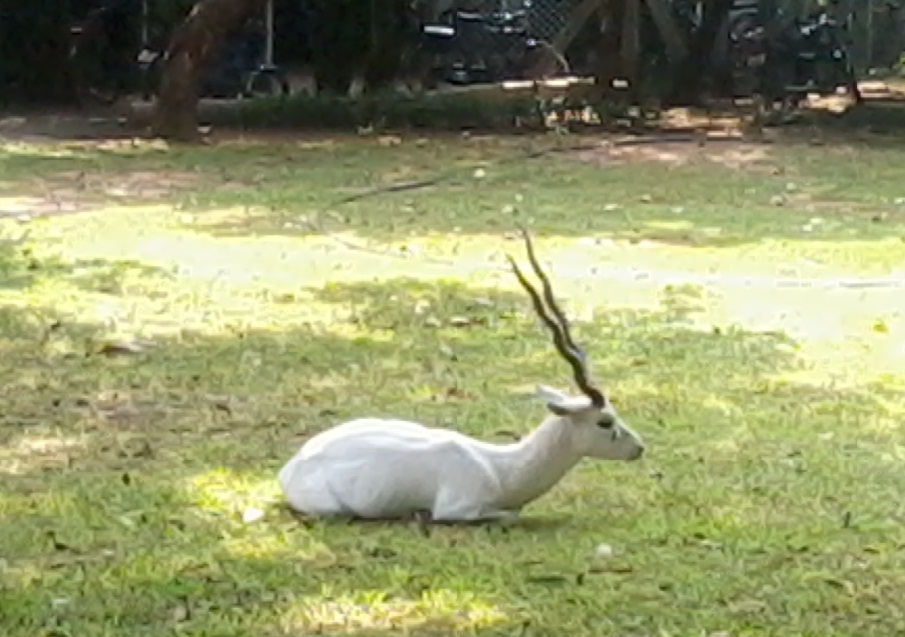
An albino blackbuck at IIT Madras, IITM is also home to Endangered Species of blackbuck

The Fifth Estate is the official media body of IIT Madras and gives an insight into the happenings inside the campus and important news related to the institute.

The Open Air Theatre hosts the weekly movie, a Saturday night tradition, besides other activities. It seats over 7,000.

NSS in IIT Madras has been noted for taking up socially relevant initiatives, taken up as individual projects to create an impact on society as well as the students. The wing of NSS at IITM has over 400 students every year, contributing to the cause of the scheme. Since its inception, it has achieved many milestones in its history as a unique, student-run organisation. Linked with several NGOs and social organisations both within and outside Chennai. By working out projects from Braille magazines to technology interventions, from teaching children in urban slums to educational video content, NSS (IITM) seeks to challenge mediocre thinking.

Student bodies such as Vivekananda Study Circle (VSC), Islamic Study Circle, IIT Christian Fellowship, Genesis and Reflections focus on spiritual discussions.

Regional groups include, Marathi Mitra Mandal (MMM), Hindi Mitra Mandal (HMM), Karka Kasadara (Tamil), Kerala Kala Samithi (KKS), Garvi Gujarati Sangathan (GGS), Telugu Samskruthika Samithi and Kannada Samskrutika Sangh, North-east Students Association (SADINER), and African Students Association (AFSA) by students from the African Continent.

The campus has evolved a slang, called Insti Lingo, attracting a published Master's thesis at a German University. A mix of English, Hindi, Telugu (Gult), Malayalam (Mallu) and Tamil (Tam), aspects of the campus slang have been adopted by some other Chennai colleges.

Unlike its sister institutions, IIT Madras has no single Indian language used among its students: Tamil, Telugu, Malayalam, Marathi, Kannada, English and Hindi are all very commonly used. All student participatory activities, such as quizzing, debating, dramatics, short-film making, and others, are held in English. This is even reflected in the slang that uses more English and other Indian regional languages than Hindi, unlike in IITM's northern counterparts.

Prakriti Wildlife Club at IIT Madras was founded in April 2002 by students, faculty, staff, residents, and alumni who are wildlife enthusiasts.

On April 17, 2026, IIT Madras introduced OmegaBall to India for the first time, hosting an inter-college tournament and proposing the establishment of a National OmegaBall Club

=== IIT Madras Heritage Centre ===
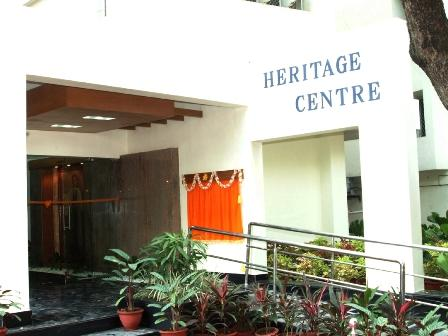
Entrance of the Heritage Centre at IIT Madras

The Heritage Centre was formally inaugurated by Dr Arcot Ramachandran, former Director IIT Madras on 3 March 2006. The centre is located on the ground floor of the administration building. The actual idea of a Heritage Centre was mooted in the year 2000 and has become a reality due to the efforts of the Professor-in-charge, Dr Ajit Kumar Kolar, and his team. The centre will function as a repository of material of heritage value and historical significance of various facets of the institute.

The exhibits include photographs, documents, publications, paintings, portraits, products developed and other articles. Information regarding important events, laboratory development, visits of important dignitaries, Indo-German cooperative activities, and academic achievements of faculty and students is also included. Aspects of IITM campus features and development, campus life and student activities are also included, thus broadening the scope of the centre in the future to non-academic activities.

== Notable alumni ==
- Aravind Srinivas, CEO and Co-founder, Perplexity AI
- Arumugam Manthiram, director, Texas Materials Institute, Professor of Mechanical Engineering, University of Texas at Austin
- Anand Rajaraman, founder of Junglee; currently heading Kosmix.com with Venky Harinarayan
- Anant Agarwal, professor of Electrical Engineering and Computer Science at MIT
- Anima Anandkumar, Bren Professor of Computing at California Institute of Technology. She is a director of Machine Learning research at NVIDIA.
- Arun Sundararajan, professor at Stern School of Business, New York University
- Atul Chokshi, materials engineer, Shanti Swarup Bhatnagar laureate
- B. N. Suresh, director of IIST
- B. Muthuraman, managing Director of Tata Steel
- Balaji Sampath, founder of Ahaguru
- Bhaskar Ramamurthi, director, IIT Madras (2011–2022)
- Gururaj Deshpande, founder of Sycamore Networks
- T. V. Rajan Babu, professor of chemistry at Ohio State University
- G. K. Ananthasuresh, professor at Indian Institute of Science
- Hari Balakrishnan, Fujitsu Chair Professor in the EECS Department at MIT
- Jai Menon, IBM Fellow, CTO and VP, Technical Strategy – IBM Systems and Technology Group
- B. Jayant Baliga, inventor of the insulated gate bipolar transistor (IGBT)
- Jayaraman Chandrasekhar, computational chemist, Shanti Swarup Bhatnagar laureate
- Kris Gopalakrishnan, co-chairman and co-founder of Infosys
- Krishna Bharat, creator of Google News, principal scientist, Google
- L. Mahadevan, FRS, de Valpine Professor of Applied Mathematics, Physics and Biology, Harvard University, MacArthur Fellow 2009
- K. Mani Chandy, former chair of Engineering and Applied Science at Caltech
- Marti G. Subrahmanyam, professor of finance, Stern School of Business at New York University
- Murali Sastry, nanotechnologist, Shanti Swarup Bhatnagar laureate
- Mas Subramanian, Milton Harris Chair Professor of Materials Chemistry at Oregon State University
- Narayanan Chandrakumar, chemical physicist, Shanti Swarup Bhatnagar laureate
- Neelesh B. Mehta, communications engineer, Shanti Swarup Bhatnagar laureate
- Prabhakar Raghavan, vice president of Engineering, Google and Consulting Professor at Stanford University
- R. Prasanna, guitarist and Carnatic musician
- Pinaki Majumdar, condensed matter physicist, Shanti Swarup Bhatnagar laureate
- Prem Watsa, billionaire; founder, chairman, and chief executive of Fairfax Financial Holdings, which owns BlackBerry
- Radha Vembu, co-founder, Zoho Corporation.
- Ramanathan V. Guha, inventor of RSS feed technology, computer scientist at Google; won the Distinguished Alumnus award from IIT Madras in 2013
- Ramesh Govindan, Northrop Grumman Chair in Engineering and Professor of Computer Science and Electrical Engineering at the University of Southern California; won the Distinguished Alumnus award from IIT Madras in 2014
- Raghu Ramakrishnan, technical fellow and CTO, Information Services Microsoft
- Raju Narayana Swamy, IAS Officer
- Ramayya Krishnan, dean of the Heinz College at Carnegie Mellon University
- Ramjee Yadav, Minister of Labour, Employment and Social Security of Nepal
- S. Sowmya, Carnatic vocalist
- Timothy A. Gonsalves, computer scientist and first director of IIT Mandi
- Shashi Nambisan, director of the Center for Transportation Research and Education at Iowa State University
- Shekhar Bhansali, division director in Electrical, Communication and Cyber Systems (ECCS) at the National Science Foundation.
- Sridhar Tayur, Ford Distinguished Research Chair and Professor of Operations Management at Carnegie Mellon University; founder, SmartOps and OrganJet
- Sridhar Vembu, founder and CEO of Zoho Corporation
- Subra Suresh, former president of Carnegie Mellon University, former director of the National Science Foundation, former dean of the MIT School of Engineering
- Venkat Rangan, co-founder and CTO at Clearwell Systems
- Venkatesan Guruswami, associate professor, Department of Computer Science, Carnegie Mellon University
- Venky Harinarayan, co-founder Kosmix
- Vic Gundotra, former senior vice president of Google, creator of Google Plus and MIT Technology Review top innovator in the world
- Vinay Nair, visiting professor at The Wharton School and founding principal of Ada Investments
- Viswanathan Kumaran, chemical engineer, Shanti Swarup Bhatnagar laureate
- Zarin Shihab, Indian actress

== Companies run by IIT Madras alumni ==
- Zoho Corporation, Indian Multinational Technology Company
- Ather Energy, Indian Electric Two Wheeler Manufacturer
- AgniKul Cosmos, an Indian Aerospace Manufacturer

== See also ==
- Indian Institutes of Technology
- Institutes of National Importance
- List of institutions of higher education in India
- List of universities in India
- Education in India
