= Zoho Corporation =

Indian technology company

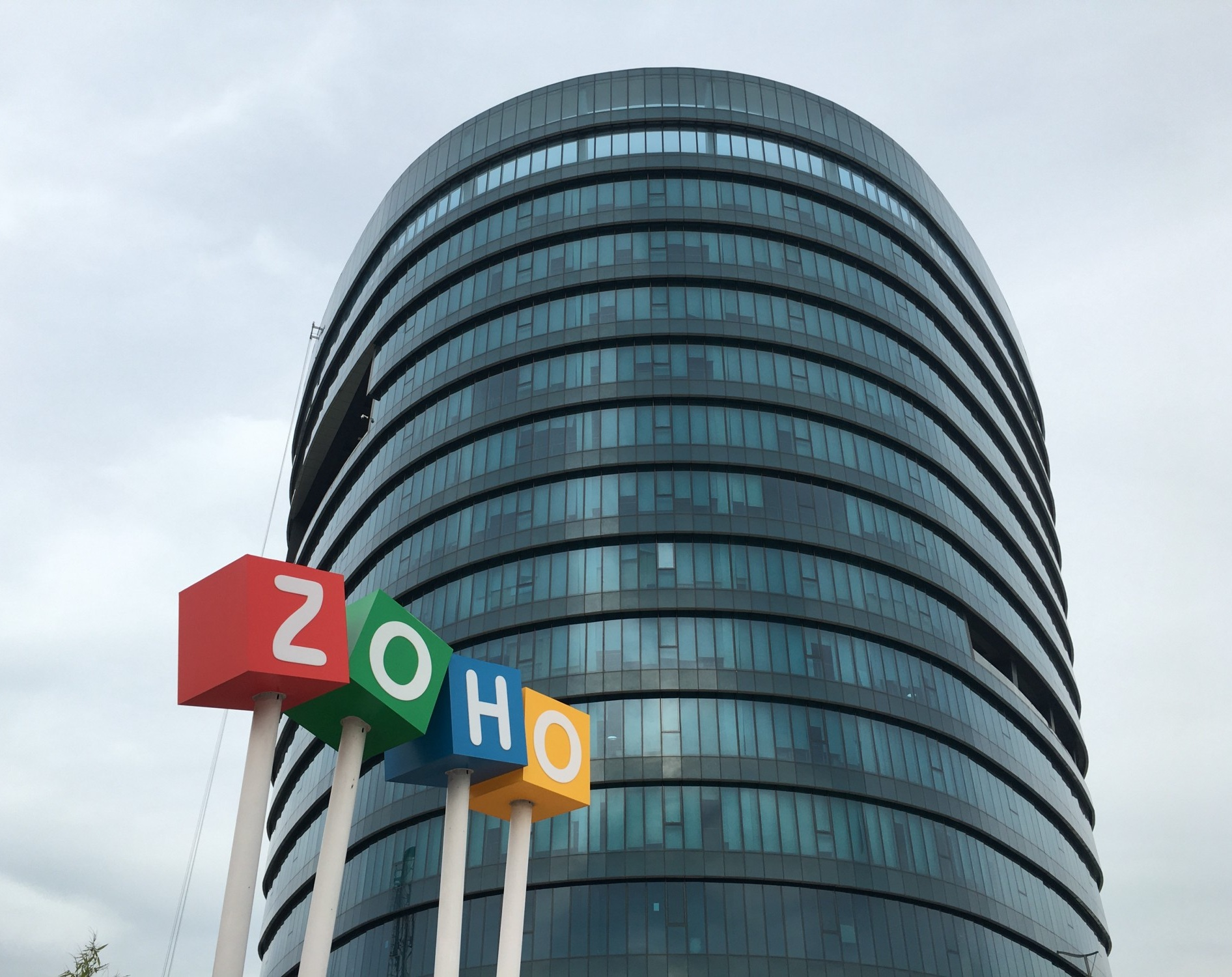
- Zoho headquarters in Chennai, India
- Formerly: AdventNet (1996–2009)
- Type: Private
- Industry: Software
- Founded: 1996; 30 years ago
- Founders: Sridhar Vembu; Tony Thomas; Sreenivas Kanumuru; Kumar Vembu; Sekar Vembu; Shailesh Kumar Davey
- Headquarters: Chennai, Tamil Nadu, India
- Key people: Shailesh Kumar Davey (CEO); Sridhar Vembu (chief scientist)
- Revenue: ₹123.13 billion (US$1.5 billion) (FY2025)
- Net income: ₹31.91 billion (US$380 million) (FY2025)
- Number of employees: 19,000+ (2026)
- Website: www.zohocorp.com

Zoho Corporation is a technology company founded by Sridhar Vembu. It is based in Austin, Texas and Chennai, India. Its range of software tools cater to sales and marketing, customer service, and internet security. According to Forbes, as of 2025, its software is used by over 120 million users across over a million organisations.
