= Kurukshetra (college festival) =

Techno-management in Tamil Nadu, India

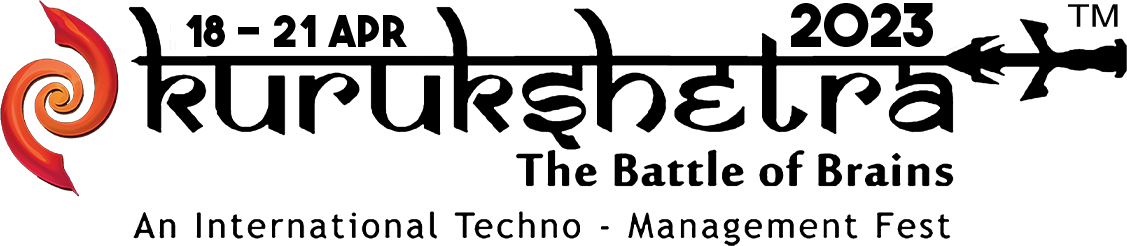
- Genre: Techno-management fest
- Locations: Chennai, India
- Founded: 2007
- Major events: K!Box, Xceed, Robowars, Godspeed, on-site and online programming contests, initiatives
- Filing status: Student-run, non-profit
- Prize money: 1 million INR
- Website: kurukshetraceg.org.in

Kurukshetra is an international techno-management fest conducted annually by the College of Engineering, Guindy (CEG) in Chennai, Tamil Nadu, India. It is a four-day event organized by the college's largest technical body, the CEG Tech Forum (CTF). The name of the fest derives from the location of the apocalyptic battle between the Kauravas and the Pandavas in the ancient Indian epic, the Mahabharata. The tag-line of the fest, "The Battle of Brains", refers to the battle. The fest was first held in 2007 and was the first techno-management festival in India to be awarded UNESCO patronage. Its logo, the cyclotron, symbolizes the celebration of the indomitable spirit of engineering and innovation.

== Working committee ==
The festival is organized by CEG Tech Forum. Founded in 2006, the Forum is a student-run organization, currently consisting of 19 teams: Brand Relations, Content, Design, Events, Finance, Guest Lectures, Hospitality, Human Resources, Industry Relations and Media, Initiatives, Internal Auditing, Logistics, Marketing, Projects, Promo, Quality Assurance and Control, Technical Operations, Workshops, Xceed (outreach) and Karnival (entertainment). Overall, there are around 600 members at various levels of the hierarchy.

== History ==
Hosted for the first time in January 2007, the fest included workshops entitled "Autonomous Robotics", "Ethical Hacking", "Alcatraz" and "Need for Speed" as part of the event. The project exhibition event received an overwhelming response with more than 250 entries and 25 teams short-listed for the final display.

Kurukshetra was the first student-organized tech fest in India to receive UNESCO patronage, in 2011. Kurukshetra was also titled Green Fest by the UN Conference for Sustainable Development in the previous edition in 2012. The student-managed committee is certified to the ISO 9001:2015 quality standard.

== Karnival ==
Karnival is an event that presents displays on science, technology, arts, history and culture. Some of the past exhibits are a magic show and 3D-floor painting held in 2014, an Arjun tank demonstration and laser tag game in 2015, and caricature workshop, photography workshop, Rubik's cube workshop and virtual reality exhibition in 2016.

== Guest lectures ==
Year	Guest lecturers
2016	Angelo Vermeulen, crew commander of a MARS simulation program funded by NASA; Arjun Shetty, COO & co-founder of BankBazaar; Chiragh Dewan and Himanshu Vaishnav, founders of Airocorp; Dr. Seshagiri Rao, associate director at the Indian Space Research Organisation; Girish Mathrubootham, CEO of Freshdesk; Hemanth Kumar Guruswamy, CEO of Airtel Broadband; Masha Nazeem, scientist and inventor
2015	Dr. Shashi Tharoor, former Under-Secretary-General of the United Nations and Indian politician; Dr. Kiran Bedi, India's first and highest ranking woman IPS officer; Dr. P. Sivakumar, distinguished scientist and director, CVRDE, DRDO; Ashok Krish, Head of Social Media and Workplace Re-imagination Practice, TCS; Padma Shri Arunachalam Muruganantham, social entrepreneur, inventor of a low-cost sanitary pad making machine; S. Somasegar, corporate vice-president of the Developer Division, Microsoft; V. Ponraj, scientist at the DRDO and scientific advisor to Dr. A. P. J. Abdul Kalam; Padma Shri Dr. V. Adimurthy, Hon. Distinguished Professor, ISRO & Mission Concept Director, Mars Orbiter Mission a.k.a. Mangalyaan; Dan Burns, AP Physics teacher at Los Gatos High School
2014	Leonardo Chiariglione, chairman and co-founder of Moving Picture Experts Group; Anand Sampathraman, Head of Plant and Enterprise Sustainability Solutions Engineering & Industrial Services, Tata Consultancy Services; Praveen Vettiyatti, Director of Renewable Energy at Industrial Engineering and General Contracting; Dr. K. Sivan, Project Director of the Geosynchronous Satellite Launch Vehicle; Kumar Rangarajan, founder of Little Eye labs
2013	Guido Tonelli, particle physicist at the European Organization for Nuclear Research (CERN); Daniel Kish, expert in human echolocation and the President of the World Access for the Blind; Shanker Annaswamy, senior advisor of IBM, South Asia; Pulkit Gaur, founder of Gridbots; Rajalakshmi Subramanian, Senior Director of Groupon; Stephen Wolfram, creator of Mathematica and Wolfram Alpha; Shiva Ayyadurai, claimed inventor of email; Osamu Hasegawa, developer of SOINN

== Workshops ==
The workshops range all over the radar of technology from aero-modelling, and robotics to motorcycles. Some of the notable workshops in previous editions are:

General	Wildlife Photography, Air Crash Investigation Audio Engineering, 3D printing, Journalism, Digital freeze, K!rack it, Film Direction.
Engineering	Dynamic Design, Ethical Hacking, Rocketry, Energy Scavenging, Green Computing, HTML5, Know Your Grid NoSQL, Printed Electronics, Rammed Earth Construction, Nuclear Power Generation, Sustainability Solutions, Wearable Electronics, IBM's Security Intelligence with Penetration testing, Reverse Engineering, Biomimicry. IBM's Block Chain, Deep Learning, Samsung S-Pay, Software Defined Radio & 5G, Dam Designing, ArduinoSAT, Electro-Hydraulics Panel Designing, Chennai Undergrounnd Metro ventilation.
Robotics	Mobile Robotics, SCARA (Selective Compliance Assembly Robot Arm) Echo - Speech Control Robot, Autonomous Mobile Plotter Robot, Face gesture controlled robot, Bluetooth controlled bots, Brainwave-controlled Robots, Eye-controlled robots, Underwater Robotics.
Management	That's how you talk, Personal Branding & Networking, Spirit of Entrepreneurship, Venture Capitalism, Growth Hacking
School	Krithi, a workshop that spots the finest aspirants of innovation at the school level
BioTech	Drug Designing
