= Seshadri =

Seshadri or Sheshadri is an Indian name. Seshadri refers to Sesha, the dasa of Vishnu, in the Vaishnava tradition of Hinduism. Seshadri refers to Sesha, the Snake and Adri the mountain

Notable people with the name include:

- C. S. Seshadri (1932–2020), Indian mathematician
- Ganesh Seshadri, known as 'Bid', singer of British post punk group The Monochrome Set
- Haricharan Seshadri (born 1987), Indian singer
- Janamanchi Seshadri Sarma (1882–1950), Telugu poet
- K. Seshadri Iyer (1845–1901), advocate who served as the Dewan of Mysore
- Kartik Seshadri (born 1957), sitarist, composer and teacher
- Meenakshi Seshadri (born 1963), Indian film actress
- Nambirajan Seshadri (born 1962), Indian-American Professor of Electrical and Computer Engineering
- P. Sheshadri (born 1963), Kannada filmmaker and director
- Shekhar Sheshadri, Indian psychiatrist, brother of Meenakshi Seshadri
- Seshadri Srinivasa Ayyangar, Indian lawyer, politician and freedom fighter
- Seshadri Swamigal (1870–1929), Indian saint
- Vijay Seshadri (born 1954), Brooklyn-based poet, essayist and literary critic

== Other uses ==
- Seshadri, one of the seven hills of the Tirumala Venkateswara Temple
- Seshadri constant, in algebraic geometry is an invariant of an ample line bundle L at a point P on an algebraic variety
- Seshadripuram, residential locality in the central part of the city of Bengaluru
- Padma Seshadri Bala Bhavan, group of schools located in Chennai, India

== See also ==
- Seshagiri
