= Seshagiri =

Sheshagiri is an Indian name.

== People ==
- Rayasam Seshagiri Rao (1909–1963), member of Indian Parliament and writer
- Seshagiri Mallampati (born 1941), an Indian anesthesiologist.
- Seshagiri Rao (1933–2019), an Indian politician
- Seshagiri Rao Vellanki (born 1953), an Indian scientist
- Yerra Seshagiri Rao, popularly known as Giri Babu, an Indian actor, producer, and director

== See also ==
- Seshadri
