= Nandini Harinath =

Rocket scientist at ISRO

Nandini Harinath is a scientist at ISRO's (Indian Space Research Organisation) Satellite Centre in Bengaluru. She is a part of the Mars Orbiter Mission, Mangalyaan. She has co-authored a research paper on mission planning, analysis and operations—Outline of key components.

== Life ==
Harinath's first exposure to science was the popular series Star Trek on television. Her mother is a maths teacher and her father is an engineer and as a family, they were all interested in science fiction and Star Trek.

She has two daughters and a niece.

== Career ==
ISRO was the first job that Harinath applied to. She has worked on 14 missions over 20 years at ISRO. She is the Project Manager, Mission Designer and served as deputy operations director on the Mars Orbiter Mission, also called Mangalyaan. In 2021, she donated the sari which she wore on November 30, 2013, when the spacecraft left Earth orbit on its way to intersect Mars, to the National Air and Space Museum of the Smithsonian Institution.

== Publications ==
1. A Mechanism for Observed Interannual Variabilities over the Equatorial Indian Ocean
2. Resourcesat-1 mission planning, analysis and operations—Outline of key components
