= V. Adimurthy =

Indian rocket scientist

- Born: 5 May 1946 (age 80); Rajahmundry, Andhra Pradesh, India
- Education: Indian Institute of Technology Kanpur
- Known for: Chandrayaan I, Chandrayaan-2, Mangalyaan, Indian space program
- Spouse: Sandhyamurthy Vipparthi
- Scientific career
- Fields: Aerospace Engineering; Hypersonic flows
- Workplaces: Indian Space Research Organisation

Notes
- Mission Concept Designer; Chandrayaan I, Chandrayaan-2 and Mangalyaan

Vipparthi Adimurthy (born 5 May 1946) is the ISRO Honorary Distinguished Professor, VSSC. He was the former Satish Dhawan Professor and Dean of Research at the Indian Institute of Space Science and Technology (IIST). Prior to joining IIST, Adimurthy held the post of associate director at the Vikram Sarabhai Space Centre, a major facility center of Indian Space Research Organisation (ISRO). He is known for his contributions to the rocket technology and space dynamics. He is a recipient of Padma Shri from the Government of India. Murthy is the Mission Concept Designer, for India's Mars Orbiter Mission.

== Career ==
Adimurthy was born in Rajahmundry, a district in Andhra Pradesh, India. After receiving his PhD in rarefied hypersonic flows from Indian Institute of Technology Kanpur in 1973, he joined the Indian Space Research Organisation. He was posted at Vikram Sarabhai Space Centre (VSSC) in Thiruvananthapuram as a scientist and eventually became an associate director of VSSC. Upon his retirement from VSSC in 2010, he was appointed as the Satish Dhawan Professor at the Indian Institute of Space Science and Technology where he held the post of Dean, Research & Development. Currently, he is the ISRO Honorary Distinguished Professor, VSSC.

== Honors and awards ==
A Fellow of the Aeronautical Society of India, Adimurthy received the 1997 Astronomical Society of India Award for his contributions to rocket technology. He is also a Fellow of the Alexander von Humboldt Foundation, and was a visiting scientist at the University of Stuttgart, Germany during 1979-80 and 1999–2000. He has served as the Chairman of the Inter-Agency Space Debris Coordination Committee (IADC) during 2002–2003. In 2012, Adimurthy received the Padma Shri from Government of India for his contributions to space dynamics. In 2013, he earned the International Achievement Award Laurel for Team Achievement for his work with Chandrayaan-1, the first Indian lunar probe.
