= M. Y. S. Prasad =

Indian space scientist (born 1953)

- Born: 4 May 1953 (age 73); Andhra Pradesh, India
- Alma mater: Government College of Engineering, Kakinada (BE); BITS Pilani (PhD)
- Known for: Director of the Satish Dhawan Space Centre (2013–2015)
- Awards: Padma Shri (2014)
- Scientific career
- Workplaces: Indian Space Research Organisation

M. Y. S. Prasad (born 4 May 1953) is an Indian space scientist who was director of the Satish Dhawan Space Centre (SDSC-SHAR) at Sriharikota, the launch site of the Indian Space Research Organisation (ISRO), from January 2013 until his retirement on 31 May 2015. He was awarded the Padma Shri, India's fourth-highest civilian honour, in 2014 for his work in science and engineering.

== Education ==
Prasad took a Bachelor of Engineering degree in electronics and communications from Government College of Engineering, Kakinada, in 1974, and a PhD from the Birla Institute of Technology and Science, Pilani, in 2005, with a thesis on interference in satellite communications.

== Career ==
Prasad joined ISRO in 1975 and worked for four decades across several of its centres. He began as a project engineer on the SLV-3 programme at the Vikram Sarabhai Space Centre (VSSC) in Thiruvananthapuram, and from 1982 to 1994 was deputy project director and avionics project manager for the ASLV. From 1994 to 1997 he served as Counsellor (Space) at the Indian embassy in Paris.

He was deputy project director for the PSLV in 1997–98, then associate director and, from 1999 to 2005, director of the Master Control Facility at Hassan, Karnataka, which operates India's geostationary satellites. He subsequently worked at Ahmedabad as deputy director of the Space Applications Centre and as director of its Development and Educational Communication Unit.

Prasad moved to the Satish Dhawan Space Centre as associate director in 2008 and became its director in January 2013, holding the post until his retirement in May 2015. In that role he was responsible for launch preparations and operations for PSLV and GSLV missions, including the propellant leak that halted the first launch attempt of GSLV-D5 in August 2013.

Prasad represented India on the United Nations Committee on the Peaceful Uses of Outer Space between 1996 and 2006, and was a member of the working group that drew up the UN Space Debris Mitigation Guidelines adopted by the General Assembly in 2007. He was a vice-president of the International Astronautical Federation from 2006 to 2010 and was elected a member of the International Academy of Astronautics in 2008.

== Awards and honours ==
- Kannada Rajyotsava award for science, 2001
- Elected a member of the International Academy of Astronautics, 2008
- Dr. Y. Nayudamma Memorial Award, 2013
- Honorary doctorate, Jawaharlal Nehru Technological University, Kakinada, 2013
- Padma Shri, 2014
- Vikram Sarabhai Memorial Award, 2014–15, Indian Science Congress Association
- Fellow of the Institution of Electronics and Telecommunication Engineers, with its Diamond Jubilee Medal, 2014

== See also ==
- Indian Space Research Organisation
