= Mars Orbiter Mission =

Indian orbiter mission to Mars (2013–2022)

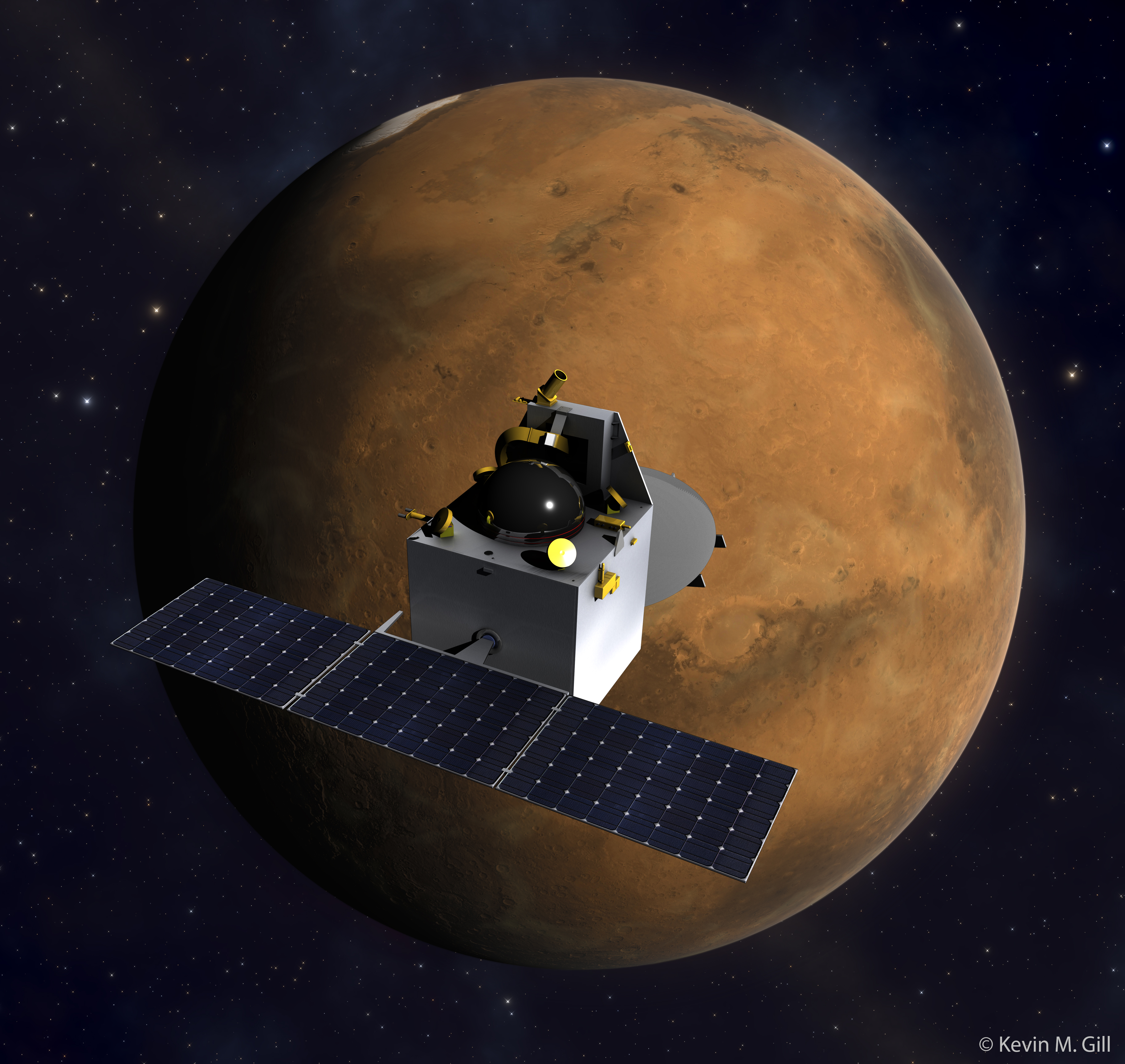
- Mars Orbiter Mission spacecraft around Mars (illustration)
- Names: Mangalyaan-1; MOM
- Mission type: Mars orbiter
- Operator: ISRO
- COSPAR ID: 2013-060A
- SATCAT no.: 39370
- Website: isro.gov.in
- Mission duration: Planned: 6 months Final: 7 years, 6 months, 8 days

Spacecraft properties
- Bus: I-1K
- Manufacturer: U. R. Rao Satellite Centre
- Launch mass: 1,337.2 kg (2,948 lb)
- BOL mass: ≈550 kg (1,210 lb)
- Dry mass: 482.5 kg (1,064 lb)
- Payload mass: 13.4 kg (30 lb)
- Dimensions: 1.5 m (4.9 ft) cube
- Power: 840 watts

Start of mission
- Launch date: 5 November 2013, 09:08 UTC (14:38 IST)
- Rocket: PSLV-XL C25
- Launch site: Satish Dhawan Space Centre, FLP
- Contractor: ISRO

End of mission
- Last contact: April 2022

Mars orbiter
- Orbital insertion: 24 September 2014, 02:10 UTC (7:40 IST); MSD 50027 06:27 AMT; 4423 days / 4305 sols

Orbital parameters
- Periareon altitude: 421.7 km (262.0 mi)
- Apoareon altitude: 76,993.6 km (47,841.6 mi)
- Inclination: 150.0°
Instruments
- MCC: Mars Colour Camera
- TIS: Thermal Infrared Imaging Spectrometer
- MSM: Methane Sensor for Mars
- MENCA: Mars Exospheric Neutral Composition Analyser
- LAP: Lyman Alpha Photometer
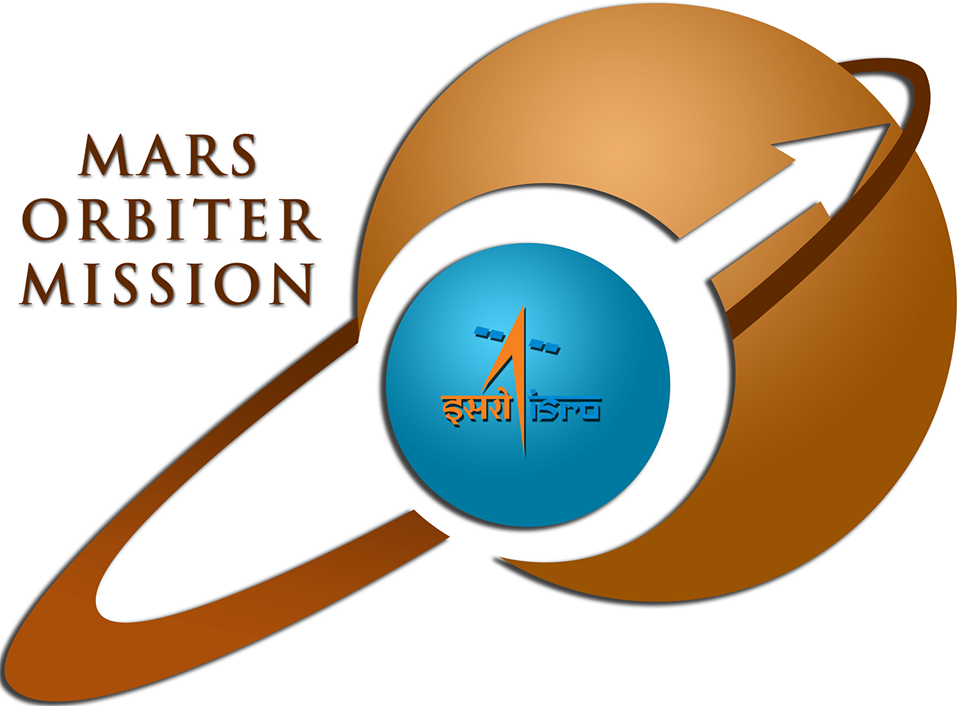
- Insignia depicting journey from Earth to an elliptical Martian orbit using Mars symbol Indian Mars exploration missions

Mars Orbiter Mission (MOM), unofficially known as Mangalyaan (Sanskrit: Maṅgala 'Mars', Yāna 'Craft, Vehicle'), is a space probe orbiting Mars since 24 September 2014. It was launched on 5 November 2013 by the Indian Space Research Organisation (ISRO). It was India's first interplanetary mission and it made ISRO the fourth space agency to achieve Mars orbit, after Soviet space program, NASA, and the European Space Agency. It made India the first Asian nation to reach Martian orbit. It also made ISRO the first national space agency in the world to do so with an indigenously developed propulsion system and the second national space agency to succeed on its maiden attempt, after the European Space Agency accomplished this in 2003 using a Roscosmos Soyuz/Fregat rocket.

The Mars Orbiter Mission probe lifted off from the First Launch Pad at Satish Dhawan Space Centre (Sriharikota Range SHAR), Andhra Pradesh, using a Polar Satellite Launch Vehicle (PSLV) rocket C25 at 09:08 (UTC) on 5 November 2013. The launch window was approximately 20 days long and started on 28 October 2013. The MOM probe spent about a month in Earth orbit, where it made a series of seven apogee-raising orbital maneuver before trans-Mars injection on 30 November 2013 (UTC). After a 298-day transit to Mars, it was put into Mars orbit on 24 September 2014.

The mission was a technology demonstrator project to develop the technologies for designing, planning, management, and operations of an interplanetary mission. It carried five scientific instruments. The spacecraft was monitored from the Spacecraft Control Centre at ISRO Telemetry, Tracking and Command Network (ISTRAC) in Bengaluru with support from the Indian Deep Space Network (IDSN) antennae at Bengaluru, Karnataka.

On 2 October 2022, it was reported that the orbiter had irrecoverably lost communications with Earth after entering a seven-hour eclipse period in April 2022 that it was not designed to survive. The following day, ISRO released a statement that all attempts to revive MOM had failed and officially declared it dead. The loss of fuel preventing the attitude adjustment of the spacecraft required to sustain battery power to the probe's instruments had been discussed at an ISRO conference on September 27 commemorating the spacecraft's eight-year anniversary of insertion into Mars orbit.

== History ==
In November 2008, the first public acknowledgement of an uncrewed mission to Mars was announced by then-ISRO chairman G. Madhavan Nair. The MOM mission concept began with a feasibility study in 2010 by the Indian Institute of Space Science and Technology after the launch of lunar satellite Chandrayaan-1 in 2008. Prime Minister Manmohan Singh approved the project on 3 August 2012, after ISRO completed ₹125 crore (US$13 million) of required studies for the orbiter. The total project cost may be up to ₹454 crore (US$47 million). The satellite costs ₹153 crore (US$16 million) and the rest of the budget has been attributed to ground stations and relay upgrades that will be used for other ISRO projects.

Assembly of the PSLV-XL launch vehicle, designated C25, started on 5 August 2013. The mounting of the five scientific instruments was completed at U. R. Rao Satellite Centre, Bengaluru, and the finished spacecraft was shipped to Sriharikota on 2 October 2013 for integration to the PSLV-XL launch vehicle. The satellite's development was fast-tracked and completed in a record 15 months, partly due to using reconfigured Chandrayaan-2 orbiter bus.

Despite the US federal government shutdown, NASA reaffirmed on 5 October 2013 it would provide communications and navigation support to the mission "with their Deep Space Network facilities.".The space agency had planned the launch on 28 October 2013 but was postponed to 5 November following the delay in ISRO's spacecraft tracking ships to take up pre-determined positions due to poor weather in the Pacific Ocean. Launch opportunities for a fuel-saving Hohmann transfer orbit occur every 26 months, in this case the next two would be in 2016 and 2018.

During a meeting on 30 September 2014, NASA and ISRO officials signed an agreement to establish a pathway for future joint missions to explore Mars. One of the working group's objectives will be to explore potential coordinated observations and science analysis between the MAVEN orbiter and MOM, as well as other current and future Mars missions.

On 2 October 2022, it was reported that the orbiter had irrecoverably lost communications with Earth after entering long eclipse period in April 2022 that it was not designed to survive. At the time of communications loss it was unknown whether the probe had lost power or inadvertently realigned its Earth-facing antenna during automatic maneuvers.

=== Team ===
Some of the scientists of ISRO and engineers involved in the mission include:

- K. Radhakrishnan led as Chairman ISRO.
- Mylswamy Annadurai was the Programme Director and was in charge of the overall project, budget management as well as direction for spacecraft configuration, schedule and resources.
- V Kesava Raju was the Mars Orbiter Mission Director.
- Subbiah Arunan was the Project Director at the Mars Orbiter Mission.
- BS Kiran was the Associate Project Director of Flight Dynamics.
- V Koteswara Rao was the ISRO scientific secretary.
- Chandradathan was the Director of the Liquid Propulsion System.
- R.Satish was the Deputy Project Director of Spacecraft Mechanical Systems.
- K.Suresh was the Deputy Project Director of Spacecraft Electrical Systems
- Moumita Dutta was the Project manager of the Mars Orbiter Mission.
- Nandini Harinath was the Deputy Operations Director of Navigation.
- Ritu Karidhal was the Deputy Operations Director of Navigation.
- B Jayakumar was an Associate Project Director at the PSLV programme which was responsible for testing the rocket systems.
- S Ramakrishnan was the Director who helped in the development of the liquid propulsion system of the PSLV launcher.
- P. Kunhikrishnan was the Project Director in the PSLV programme. He was also a Mission director of the PSLV-C25/Mars Orbiter Mission.
- A. S. Kiran Kumar was the Director of the Satellite Application Centre, who later went on to be the Chairman ISRO after this, when the team studied the Mard.
- M. Y. S. Prasad is the Director at Satish Dhawan Space Centre. He was also the chairman of the Launch Authorisation Board.
- MS Pannirselvam was the Chief General Manager at the Sriharikota Rocket port and was tasked to maintain launch schedules.
- S. K. Shivakumar was the Director at the ISRO Satellite Centre. He was also a Project Director for the Indian Deep Space Network. Mars Orbiter Mission is the product of ISRO Satellite Centre (ISAC). He spearheaded the task of conceptualization, design and realization of the unique spacecraft MOM. He ingeniously planned to realize the spacecraft in a record time of 15 months.

== Cost ==
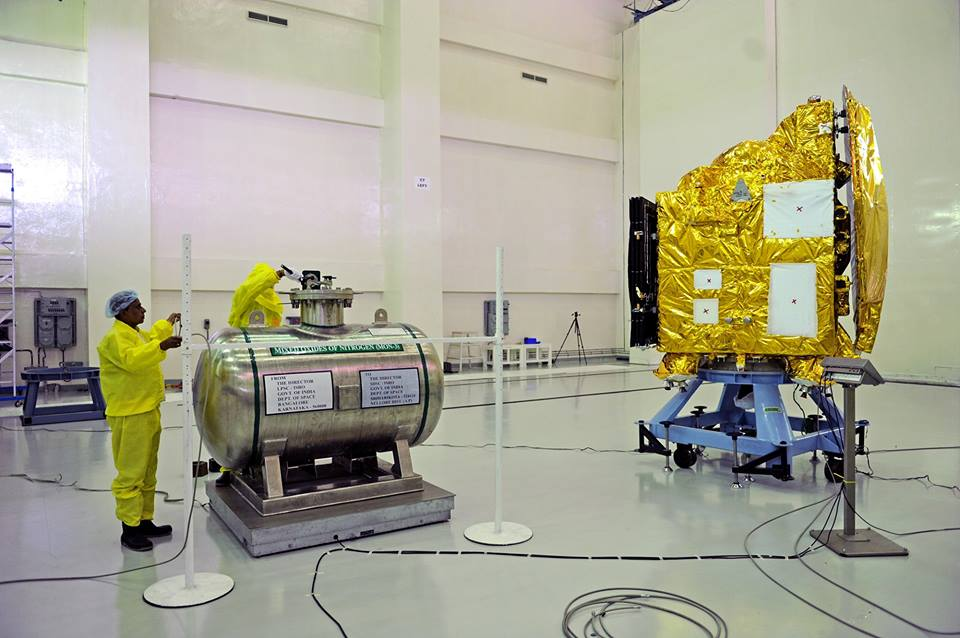
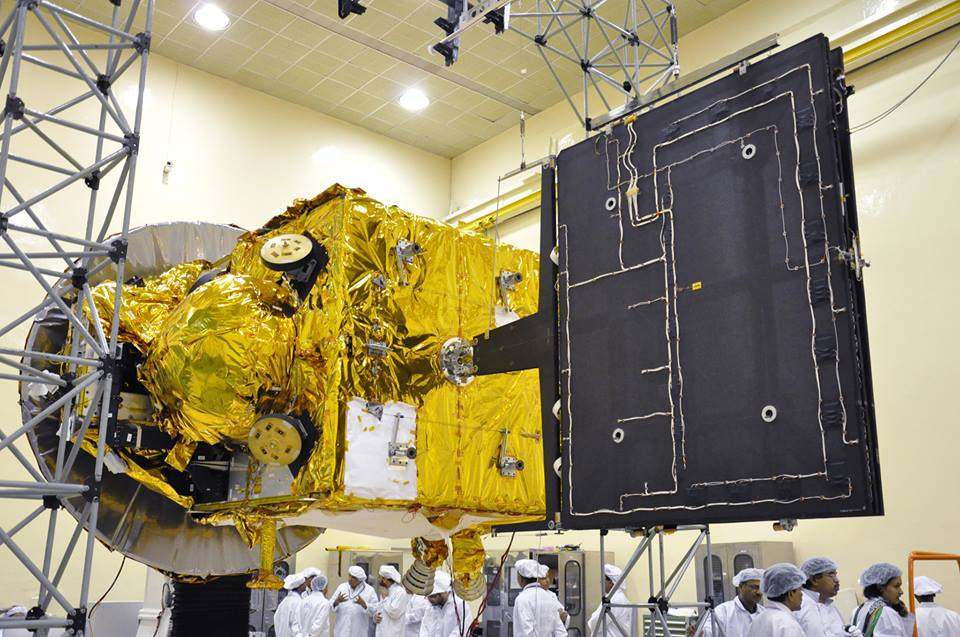
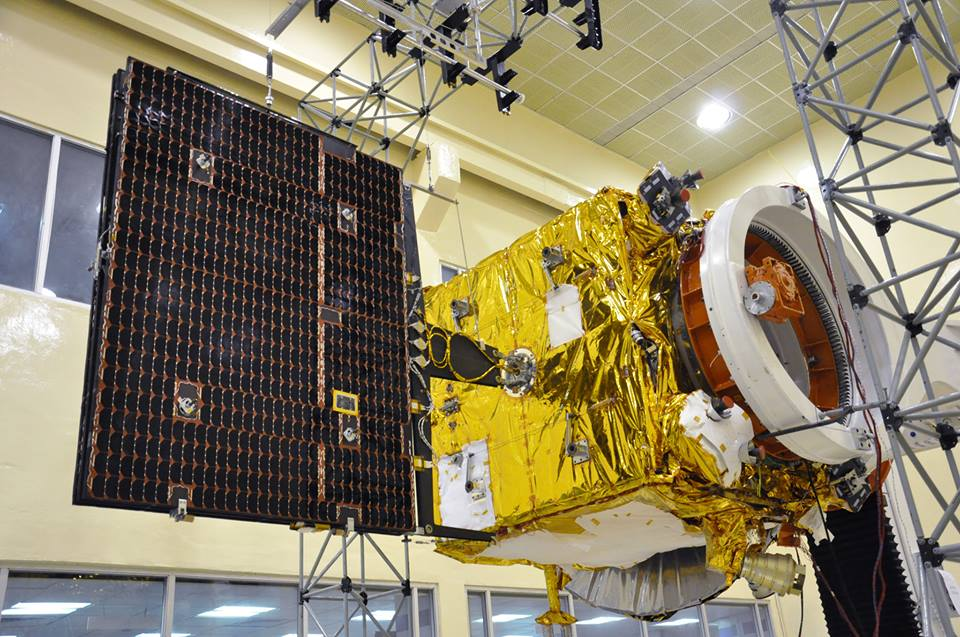
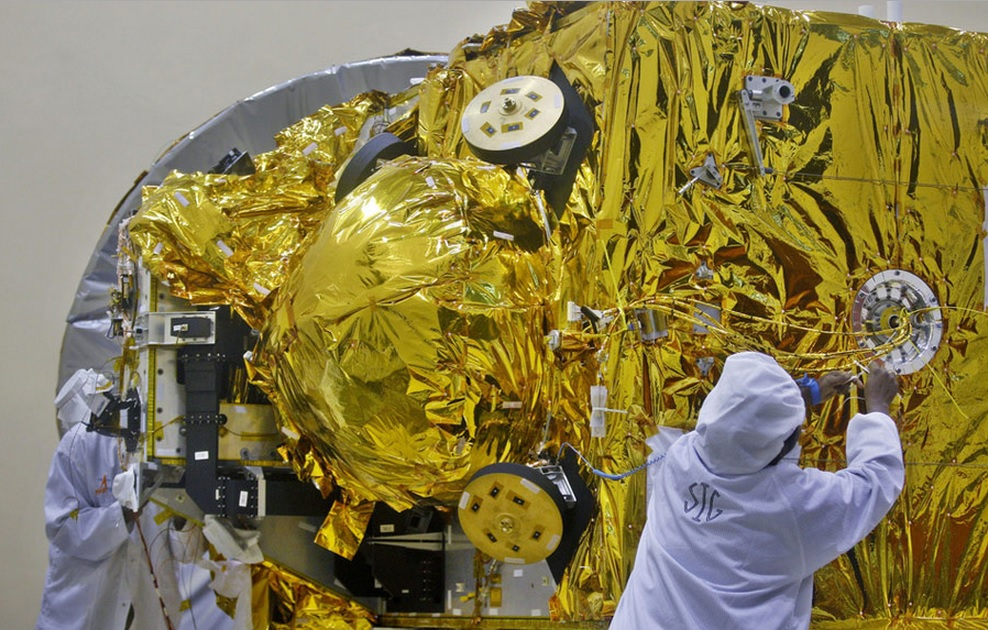
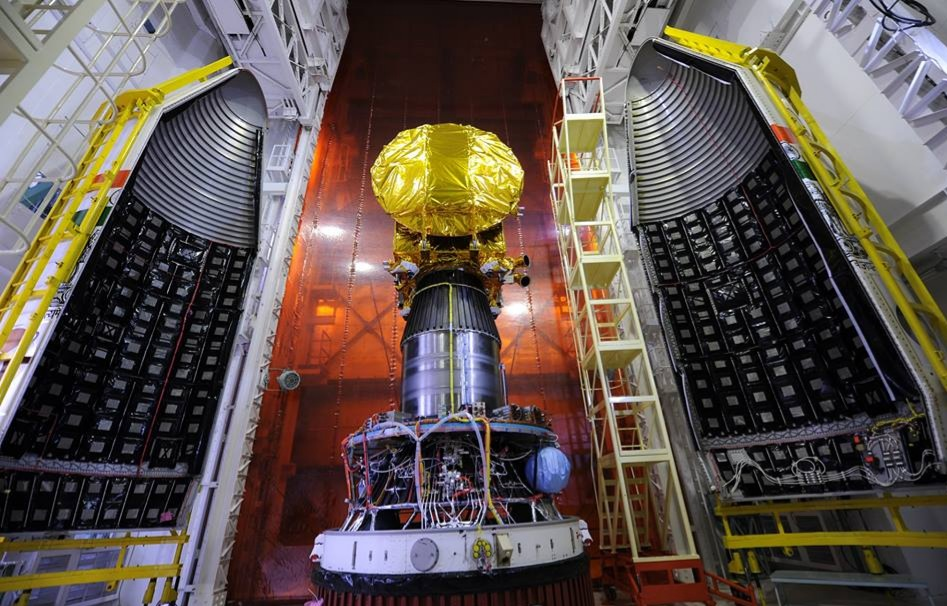
Mars Orbiter Mission spacecraft at various phases of integration

The total cost of the mission was approximately ₹450 Crore (US$73 million), making it the least-expensive Mars mission to date. The low cost of the mission was ascribed by ISRO chairman K. Radhakrishnan to various factors, including a "modular approach", few ground tests and long working days (18 to 20 hours) for scientists. BBC's Jonathan Amos specified lower worker costs, home-grown technologies, simpler design, and a significantly less complicated payload than NASA's MAVEN. Prime Minister Narendra Modi said that the mission cost just ₹7/km, cheaper than a ₹10/km auto ride in Ahmedabad and less than the film Gravity.

== Mission objectives ==
The primary objective of the mission is to develop the technologies required for designing, planning, management and operations of an interplanetary mission. The secondary objective is to explore Mars's surface features, morphology, mineralogy and Martian atmosphere using indigenous scientific instruments.

The main objectives are to develop the technologies required for designing, planning, management and operations of an interplanetary mission comprising the following major tasks:

- Orbit manoeuvres to transfer the spacecraft from Earth-centred orbit to heliocentric trajectory and finally, capture into Martian orbit
- Development of force models and algorithms for orbit and attitude (orientation) computations and analysis
- Navigation in all phases
- Maintain the spacecraft in all phases of the mission
- Meeting power, communications, thermal and payload operation requirements
- Incorporate autonomous features to handle contingency situations

=== Scientific objectives ===
The scientific objectives deal with the following major aspects:

- Exploration of Mars surface features by studying the morphology, topography and mineralogy
- Study the constituents of Martian atmosphere including methane and CO_{2} using remote sensing techniques
- Study the dynamics of the upper atmosphere of Mars, effects of solar wind and radiation and the escape of volatiles to outer space

The mission would also provide multiple opportunities to observe the Martian moon Phobos and also offer an opportunity to identify and re-estimate the orbits of asteroids seen during the Martian Transfer Trajectory. The spacecraft also provided the first views ever of the far side of Martian Moon Deimos.

=== Studies ===
In May–June 2015 Indian scientists got an opportunity to study the Solar Corona during the Mars conjunction when earth and Mars are on the opposite sides of the sun. During this period the S band waves emitted by MOM were transmitted through the Solar Corona that extends millions of kms into space. This event helped scientists study the Solar surface and regions where temperature changed abruptly.

== Spacecraft design ==
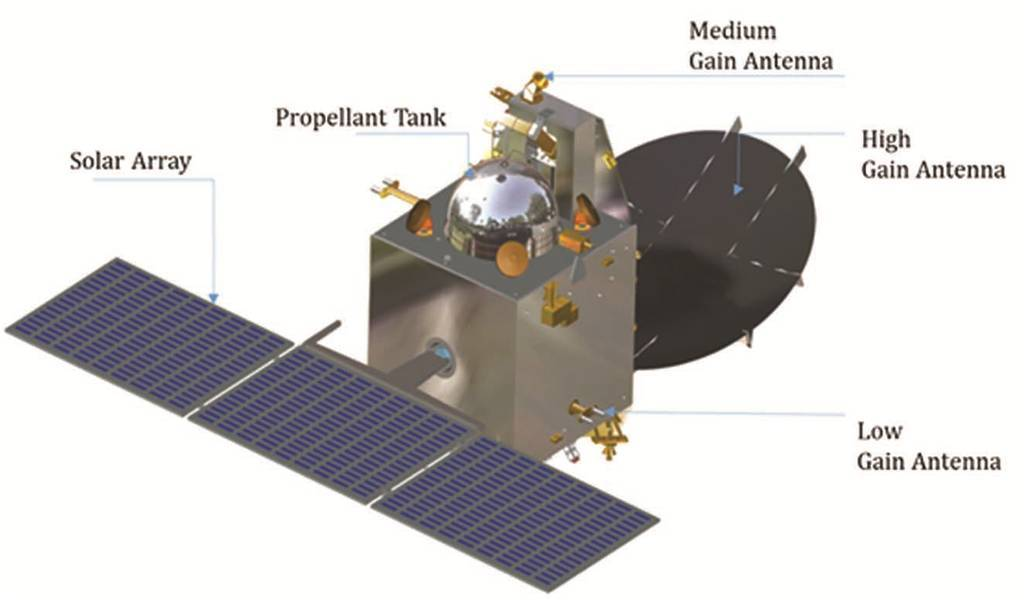
Mars Orbiter Mission

- Mass: The lift-off mass was 1,337.2 kg (2,948 lb), including 852 kg (1,878 lb) of propellant.
- Bus: The spacecraft's bus is a modified I-1 K structure and propulsion hardware configuration, similar to Chandrayaan-1, India's lunar orbiter that operated from 2008 to 2009, with specific improvements and upgrades needed for a Mars mission. The satellite structure is constructed of an aluminium and composite fibre reinforced plastic (CFRP) sandwich construction.
- Power: Electric power is generated by three solar array panels of 1.8 m × 1.4 m (5 ft 11 in × 4 ft 7 in) each (7.56 m^{2} (81.4 sq ft) total), for a maximum of 840 watts of power generation in Mars orbit. Electricity is stored in a 36 Ah Lithium-ion battery.
- Propulsion: A liquid fuel engine with a thrust of 440 newtons (99 lb_{f}) is used for orbit raising and insertion into Mars orbit. The orbiter also has eight 22-newton (4.9 lb_{f}) thrusters for attitude control (orientation). Its propellant mass at launch was 852 kg (1,878 lb).
- Attitude and Orbit Control System: Maneuvering system that includes electronics with a MAR31750 processor, two star sensors, a solar panel Sun sensor, a coarse analog Sun sensor, four reaction wheels, and the primary propulsion system.
- Antennae: Low gain antenna, mid gain antenna, and high gain antenna.

Animated deconstruction of Mangalyaan spacecraft

== Scientific instruments ==
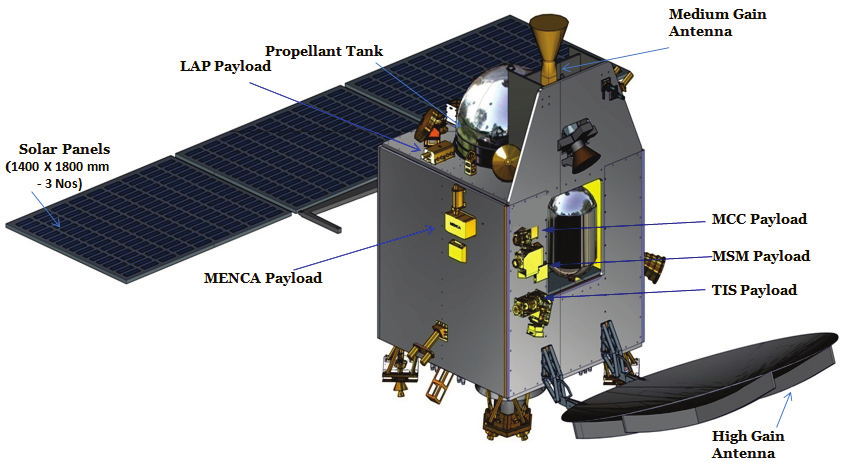
Mars Orbiter Mission – payloads Note: The position of MENCA and LAP were later slightly shifted horizontally along the shown sides of their panels

The 15 kg (33 lb) scientific payload consists of five instruments:

Mars Orbiter Mission payloads
Payload	Mass	Image	Objectives
Atmospheric studies
Lyman-Alpha Photometer (LAP)	1.97 kg (4.3 lb)		A photometer that measures the relative abundance of deuterium and hydrogen from Lyman-alpha emissions in the upper atmosphere. Measuring the deuterium/hydrogen ratio will allow an estimation of the amount of water loss to outer space. The nominal plan to operate LAP is between the ranges of approximately 3,000 km (1,900 mi) before and after Mars periapsis. Minimum observation duration for achieving LAP's science goals is 60 minutes per orbit during normal range of operation. The objectives of this instrument consists of estimation of D/H ratio, estimation of escape flux of H_{2} corona and generation of hydrogen & deuterium coronal profiles.
Methane Sensor for Mars (MSM)	2.94 kg (6.5 lb)		It was meant to measure methane in the atmosphere of Mars, if any, and map its sources with an accuracy of few 10s parts-per-billion (ppb). After entering Mars orbit it was determined that the instrument, although in good working condition, had a design flaw and it was incapable of distinguishing methane on Mars. The instrument can accurately map Mars albedo at 1.65 um. MSM design flaw: The MSM sensor was expected to measure methane in the Mars atmosphere; methane on Earth is often associated with life. However, after it entered orbit, it was reported that there was an issue with how it collected and processed data. The spectrometer could measure intensity of different spectral bands, [such as methane] but instead of sending back the spectra, it sent back the sum of the sampled spectra and also the gaps between the sampled lines. The difference was supposed to be the methane signal, but since other spectra such as carbon dioxide could have varying intensities, it was not possible to determine the actual methane intensity. The device was repurposed as an albedo mapper.
Surface imaging studies
Thermal Infrared Imaging Spectrometer (TIS)	3.20 kg (7.1 lb)		TIS measures the thermal emission and can be operated during both day and night. It would map surface composition and mineralogy of Mars and also monitor atmospheric CO_{2} and turbidity (required for the correction of MSM data). Temperature and emissivity are the two basic physical parameters estimated from thermal emission measurement. Many minerals and soil types have characteristic spectra in TIR region. TIS can map surface composition and mineralogy of Mars.
Mars Colour Camera (MCC)	1.27 kg (2.8 lb)		This tricolour camera gives images and information about the surface features and composition of Martian surface. It is useful to monitor the dynamic events and weather of Mars like dust storms/atmospheric turbidity. MCC will also be used for probing the two satellites of Mars, Phobos and Deimos. MCC would provide context information for other science payloads. MCC images are to be acquired whenever MSM and TIS data is acquired. Seven Apoareion Imaging of the entire disc and multiple Periareion images of 540 km × 540 km (340 mi × 340 mi) are planned in every orbit.
Particle environment studies
Mars Exospheric Neutral Composition Analyser (MENCA)	3.56 kg (7.8 lb)		It is a quadrupole mass analyser capable of analysing the neutral composition of particles in the range of 1–300 amu (atomic mass unit) with unit mass resolution. The heritage of this payload is from Chandra's Altitudinal Composition Explorer (CHACE) payload aboard the Moon Impact Probe (MIP) in Chandrayaan-1 mission. MENCA is planned to perform five observations per orbit with one hour per observation.

== Telemetry and command ==
The ISRO Telemetry, Tracking and Command Network performed navigation and tracking operations for the launch with ground stations at Sriharikota and Port Blair in India, Brunei and Biak in Indonesia, and after the spacecraft's apogee became more than 100,000 km, an 18 m (59 ft) and a 32 m (105 ft) diameter antenna of the Indian Deep Space Network were utilised. The 18 m (59 ft) dish antenna was used for communication with the craft until April 2014, after which the larger 32 m (105 ft) antenna was used. NASA's Deep Space Network is providing position data through its three stations located in Canberra, Madrid and Goldstone on the US West Coast during the non-visible period of ISRO's network. The South African National Space Agency's (SANSA) Hartebeesthoek (HBK) ground station is also providing satellite tracking, telemetry and command services.

=== Communications ===
Communications are handled by two 230-watt TWTAs and two coherent transponders. The antenna array consists of a low-gain antenna, a medium-gain antenna and a high-gain antenna. The high-gain antenna system is based on a single 2.2-metre (7 ft 3 in) reflector illuminated by a feed at S-band. It is used to transmit and receive the telemetry, tracking, commanding and data to and from the Indian Deep Space Network.

== Mission profile ==
Timeline of operations
Phase	Date	Event	Detail	Result	References
Geocentric phase	5 November 2013 09:08 UTC	Launch	Burn time: 15:35 min in 5 stages	Apogee: 23,550 km (14,630 mi)	
Geocentric phase	6 November 2013 19:47 UTC	Orbit raising manoeuvre	Burn time: 416 sec	Apogee: 28,825 km (17,911 mi)	
Geocentric phase	7 November 2013 20:48 UTC	Orbit raising manoeuvre	Burn time: 570.6 sec	Apogee: 40,186 km (24,970 mi)	
Geocentric phase	8 November 2013 20:40 UTC	Orbit raising manoeuvre	Burn time: 707 sec	Apogee: 71,636 km (44,513 mi)	
Geocentric phase	10 November 2013 20:36 UTC	Orbit raising manoeuvre	Incomplete burn	Apogee: 78,276 km (48,638 mi)	
Geocentric phase	11 November 2013 23:33 UTC	Orbit raising manoeuvre (supplementary)	Burn time: 303.8 sec	Apogee: 118,642 km (73,721 mi)	
Geocentric phase	15 November 2013 19:57 UTC	Orbit raising manoeuvre	Burn time: 243.5 sec	Apogee: 192,874 km (119,846 mi)	
Geocentric phase	30 November 2013 19:19 UTC	Trans-Mars injection	Burn time: 1328.89 sec	Heliocentric insertion	
Heliocentric phase	December 2013 – September 2014	En route to Mars – The probe travelled a distance of 780,000,000 kilometres (480,000,000 mi) in a Hohmann transfer orbit around the Sun to reach Mars. This phase plan included up to four trajectory corrections if needed.			
Heliocentric phase	11 December 2013 01:00 UTC	1st Trajectory correction	Burn time: 40.5 sec	Success	
Heliocentric phase	9 April 2014	2nd Trajectory correction (planned)	Not required	Rescheduled for 11 June 2014	
Heliocentric phase	11 June 2014 11:00 UTC	2nd Trajectory correction	Burn time: 16 sec	Success	
Heliocentric phase	August 2014	3rd Trajectory correction (planned)	Not required		
Heliocentric phase	22 September 2014	3rd Trajectory correction	Burn time: 4 sec	Success	
Areocentric phase	24 September 2014	Mars orbit insertion	Burn time: 1388.67 sec	Success	

Animation of Mars Orbiter Mission

Geocentric phase

Heliocentric phase

Areocentric phase

Mars Orbiter Mission · Mars · Earth · Sun

=== Launch ===
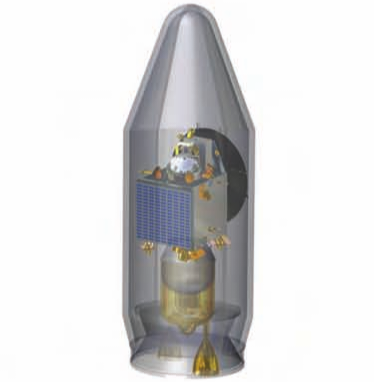
Render of encapsulated payload fairing with Mars Orbiter Mission

ISRO originally intended to launch MOM with its Geosynchronous Satellite Launch Vehicle (GSLV), but the GSLV failed twice in 2010 and still had issues with its cryogenic engine. Waiting for the new batch of rockets would have delayed the MOM for at least three years, so ISRO opted to switch to the less-powerful Polar Satellite Launch Vehicle (PSLV). Since it was not powerful enough to place MOM on a direct-to-Mars trajectory, the spacecraft was launched into a highly elliptical Earth orbit and used its own thrusters over multiple perigee burns (to take advantage of the Oberth effect) to place itself on a trans-Mars trajectory.

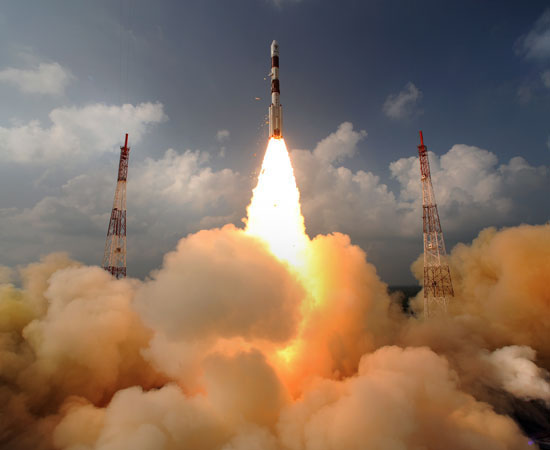
Launch of the Mars Orbiter Mission

On 19 October 2013, ISRO chairman K. Radhakrishnan announced that the launch had to be postponed by a week for 5 November 2013 due to a delay of a crucial telemetry ship reaching Fiji. The launch was rescheduled. ISRO's PSLV-XL placed the satellite into Earth orbit at 09:50 UTC on 5 November 2013, with a perigee of 264.1 km (164.1 mi), an apogee of 23,903.6 km (14,853.0 mi), and inclination of 19.20 degrees, with both the antenna and all three sections of the solar panel arrays deployed. During the first three orbit raising operations, ISRO progressively tested the spacecraft systems.

The orbiter's dry mass is 482.5 kg (1,064 lb) and it carried 852 kg (1,878 lb) of fuel at launch. Its main engine, a derivative of the system used on India's communications satellites, uses the bipropellant combination monomethylhydrazine and dinitrogen tetroxide to achieve the thrust necessary for escape velocity from Earth. It was also used to slow down the probe for Mars orbit insertion and, subsequently, for orbit corrections.

Models used for MOM:

Planetary Ephemeris	DE-424
Satellite Ephemeris	MAR063
Gravity Model (Earth)	GGM02C (100 × 100)
Gravity Model (Moon)	GRAIL360b6a (20 × 20)
Gravity Model (Mars)	MRO95A (95 × 95)
Earth Atmosphere	ISRO: DTM 2012; JPL : DTM 2010
Mars Atmosphere	MarsGram 2005
DSN Station Plate Motion	ITRF1993 frame, plate motion epoch 01-Jan-2003 00:00 UTC

=== Orbit raising manoeuvres ===
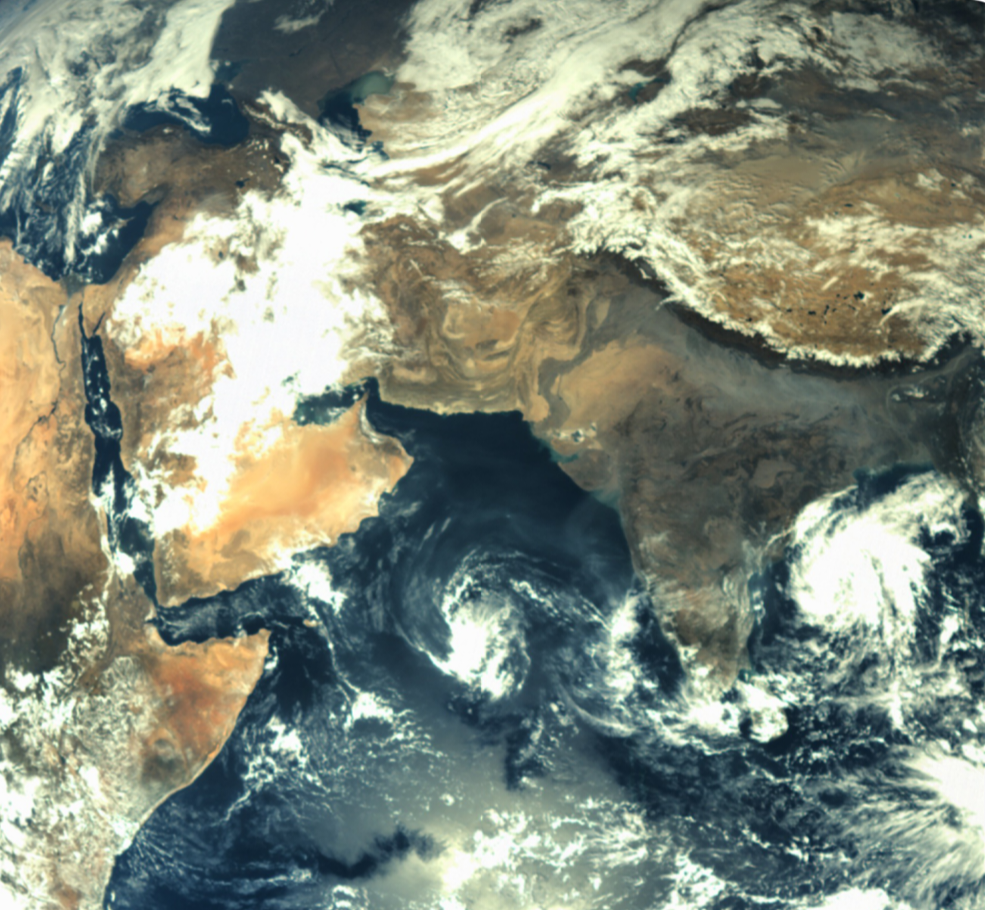
India as seen by Mars Colour Camera (MCC) during the geocentric phase

Several orbit raising operations were conducted from the Spacecraft Control Centre (SCC) at the ISRO Telemetry, Tracking and Command Network (ISTRAC) at Peenya, Bengaluru on 6, 7, 8, 10, 12 and 16 November by using the spacecraft's on-board propulsion system and a series of perigee burns. The first three of the five planned orbit raising manoeuvres were completed with nominal results, while the fourth was only partially successful. However, a subsequent supplementary manoeuvre raised the orbit to the intended altitude aimed for in the original fourth manoeuvre. A total of six burns were completed while the spacecraft remained in Earth orbit, with a seventh burn conducted on 30 November to insert MOM into a heliocentric orbit for its transit to Mars.

The first orbit-raising manoeuvre was performed on 6 November 2013 at 19:47 UTC when the spacecraft's 440-newton (99 lb_{f}) liquid engine was fired for 416 seconds. With this engine firing, the spacecraft's apogee was raised to 28,825 km (17,911 mi), with a perigee of 252 km (157 mi).

The second orbit raising manoeuvre was performed on 7 November 2013 at 20:48 UTC, with a burn time of 570.6 seconds resulting in an apogee of 40,186 km (24,970 mi).

The third orbit raising manoeuvre was performed on 8 November 2013 at 20:40 UTC, with a burn time of 707 seconds, resulting in an apogee of 71,636 km (44,513 mi).

The fourth orbit raising manoeuvre, starting at 20:36 UTC on 10 November 2013, imparted a delta-v of 35 m/s (110 ft/s) to the spacecraft instead of the planned 135 m/s (440 ft/s) as a result of underburn by the motor. Because of this, the apogee was boosted to 78,276 km (48,638 mi) instead of the planned 100,000 km (62,000 mi). When testing the redundancies built-in for the propulsion system, the flow to the liquid engine stopped, with consequent reduction in incremental velocity. During the fourth orbit burn, the primary and redundant coils of the solenoid flow control valve of 440 newton liquid engine and logic for thrust augmentation by the attitude control thrusters were being tested. When both primary and redundant coils were energised together during the planned modes, the flow to the liquid engine stopped. Operating both the coils simultaneously is not possible for future operations, however they could be operated independently of each other, in sequence.

As a result of the fourth planned burn coming up short, an additional unscheduled burn was performed on 12 November 2013 that increased the apogee to 118,642 km (73,721 mi), a slightly higher altitude than originally intended in the fourth manoeuvre. The apogee was raised to 192,874 km (119,846 mi) on 15 November 2013, 19:57 UTC in the final orbit raising manoeuvre.

=== Trans-Mars injection ===
On 30 November 2013 at 19:19 UTC, a 23-minute engine firing initiated the transfer of MOM away from Earth orbit and on heliocentric orbit toward Mars. The probe travelled a distance of 780,000,000 kilometres (480,000,000 mi) to reach Mars.

=== Trajectory correction maneuvers ===
Four trajectory corrections were originally planned, but only three were carried out. The first trajectory correction manoeuvre (TCM) was carried out on 11 December 2013 at 01:00 UTC by firing the 22-newton (4.9 lb_{f}) thrusters for a duration of 40.5 seconds. After this event, MOM was following the designed trajectory so closely that the trajectory correction manoeuvre planned in April 2014 was not required. The second trajectory correction manoeuvre was performed on 11 June 2014 at 11:00 UTC by firing the spacecraft's 22 newton thrusters for 16 seconds. The third planned trajectory correction manoeuvre was postponed, due to the orbiter's trajectory closely matching the planned trajectory. The third trajectory correction was also a deceleration test 3.9 seconds long on 22 September 2014.

=== Mars orbit insertion ===
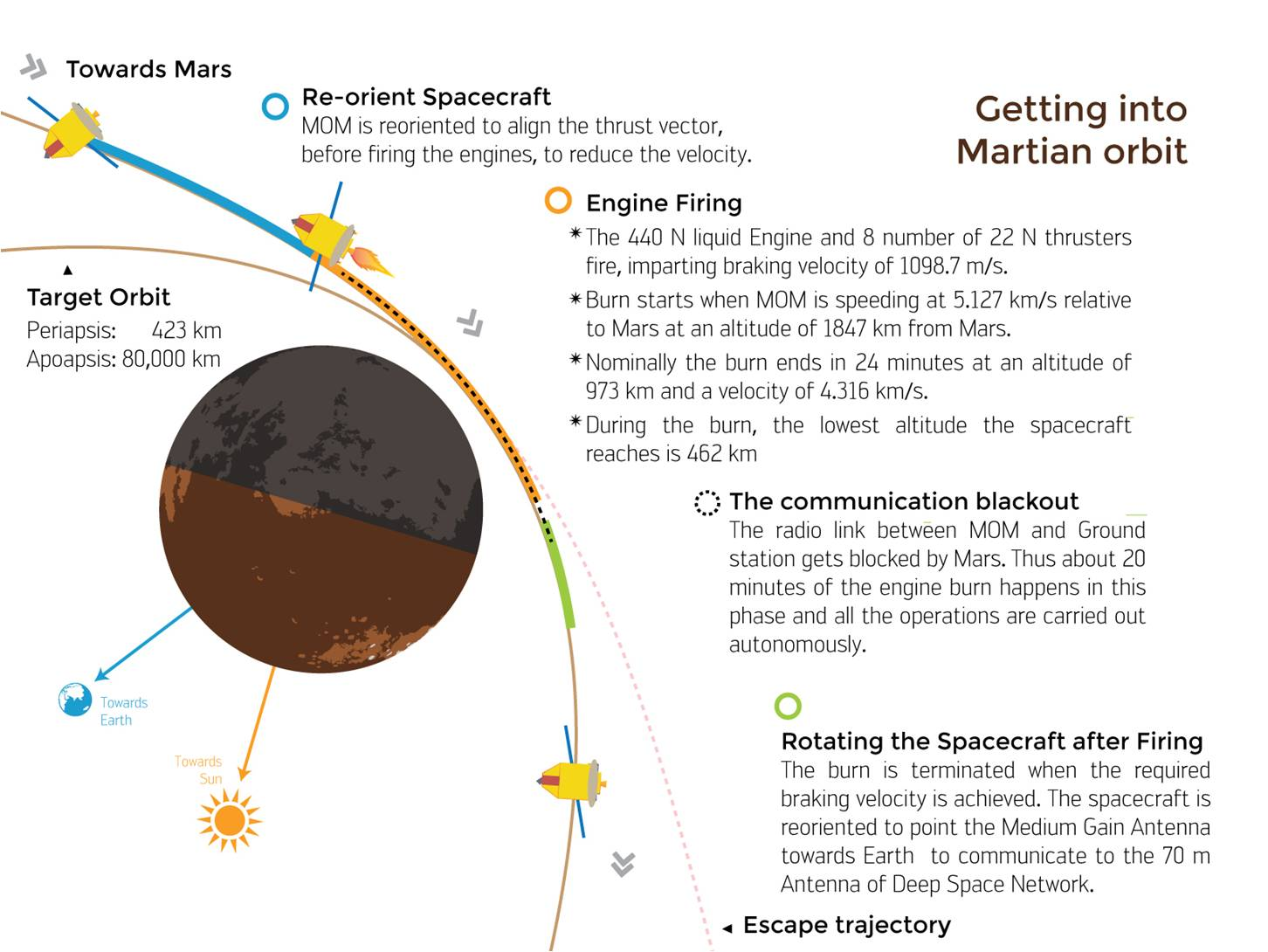
Mars orbit insertion profile

The plan was for an insertion into Mars orbit on 24 September 2014, approximately 2 days after the arrival of NASA's MAVEN orbiter. The 440-newton liquid apogee motor was test fired on 22 September at 09:00 UTC for 3.968 seconds, about 41 hours before actual orbit insertion.

Date	Time (UTC)	Event
23 September 2014	10:47:32	Satellite communication switched to medium gain antenna
24 September 2014	01:26:32	Forward rotation started for deceleration burn
24 September 2014	01:42:19	Eclipse started
24 September 2014	01:44:32	Attitude control manoeuvre performed with thrusters
24 September 2014	01:47:32	Liquid Apogee Motor starts firing
24 September 2014	02:11:46	Liquid Apogee Motor stops firing

After these events, the spacecraft performed a reverse manoeuvre to reorient from its deceleration burn and entered Martian orbit.

== Gallery ==
=== Mars global and local views ===
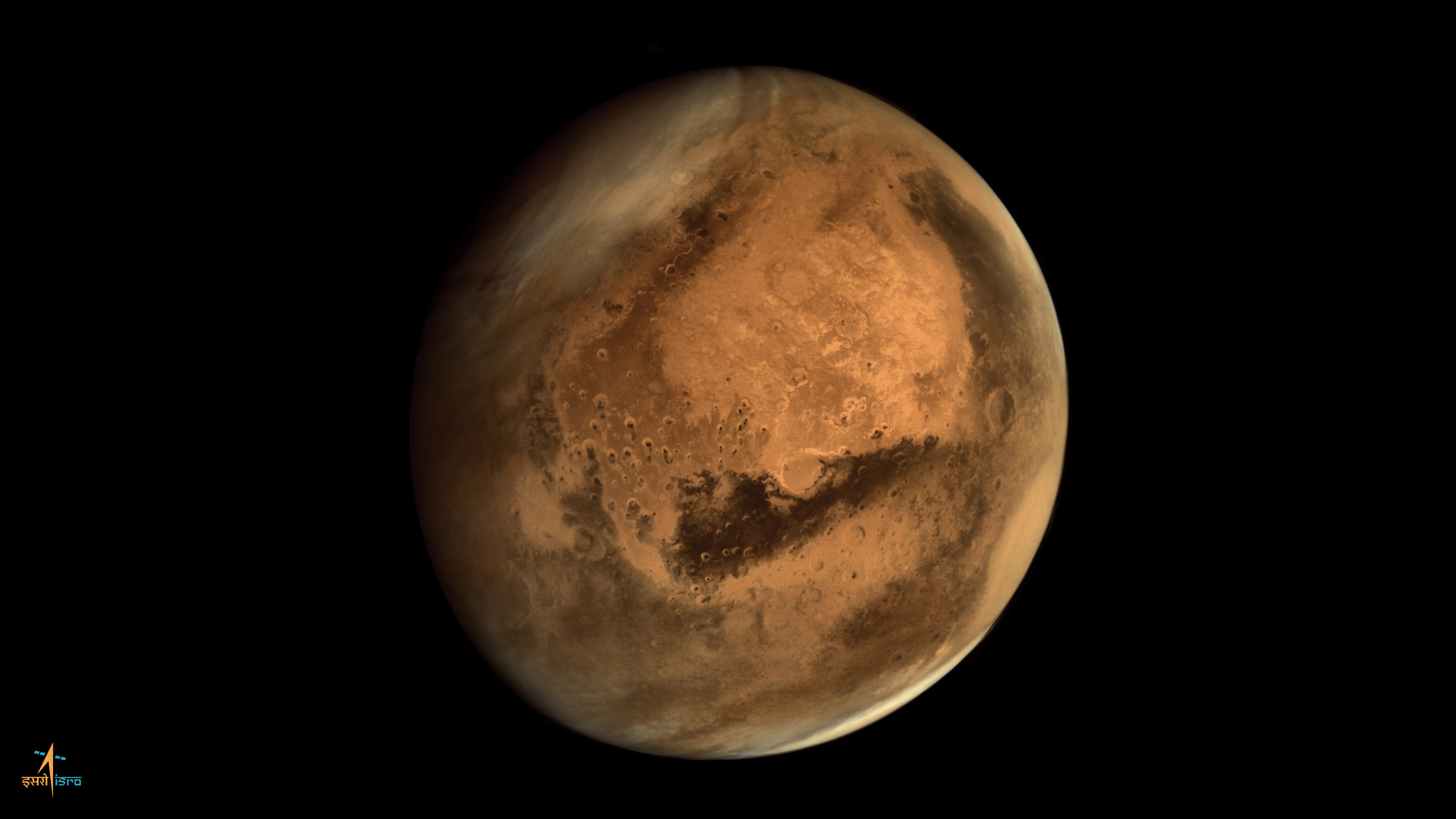

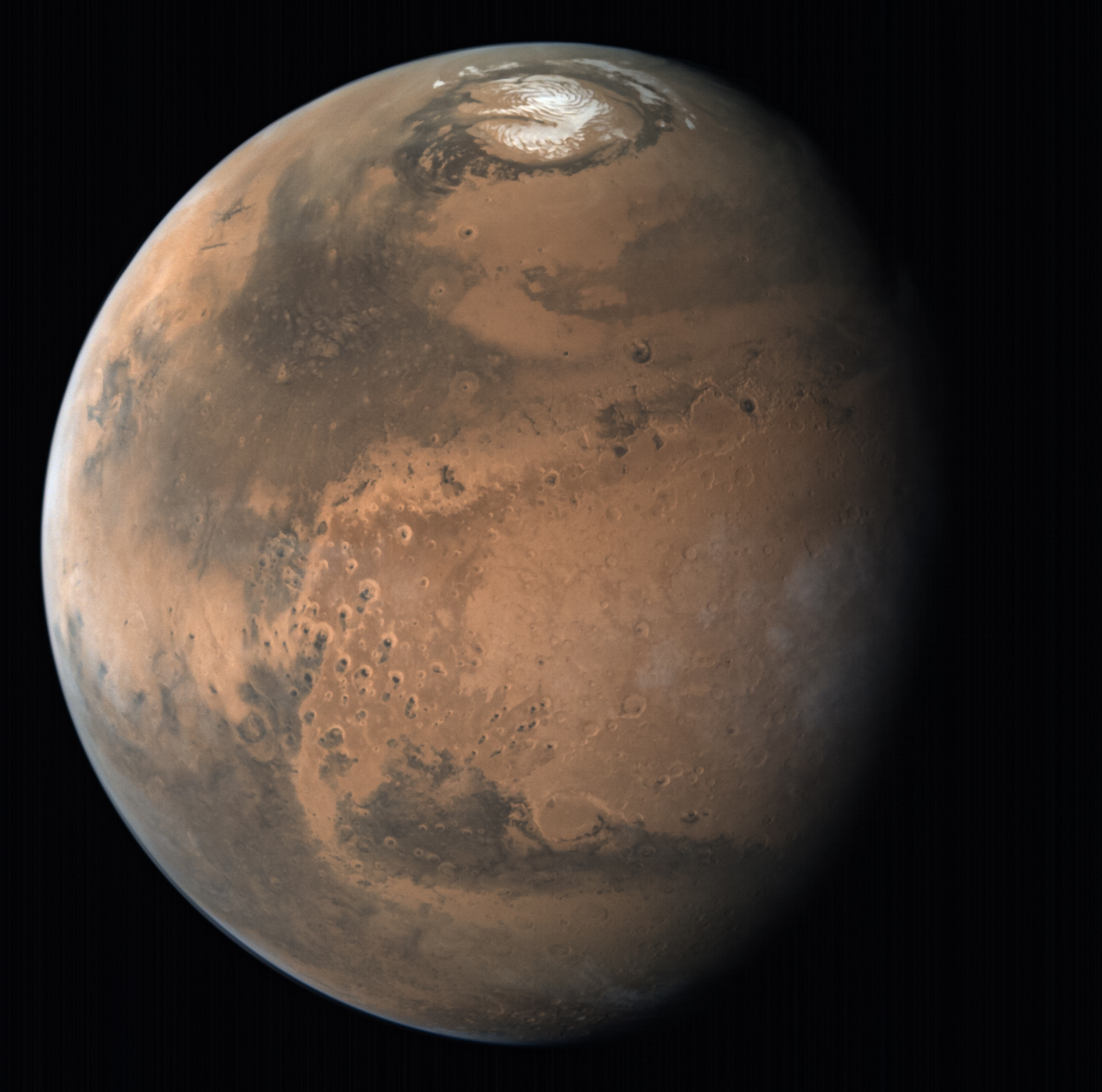

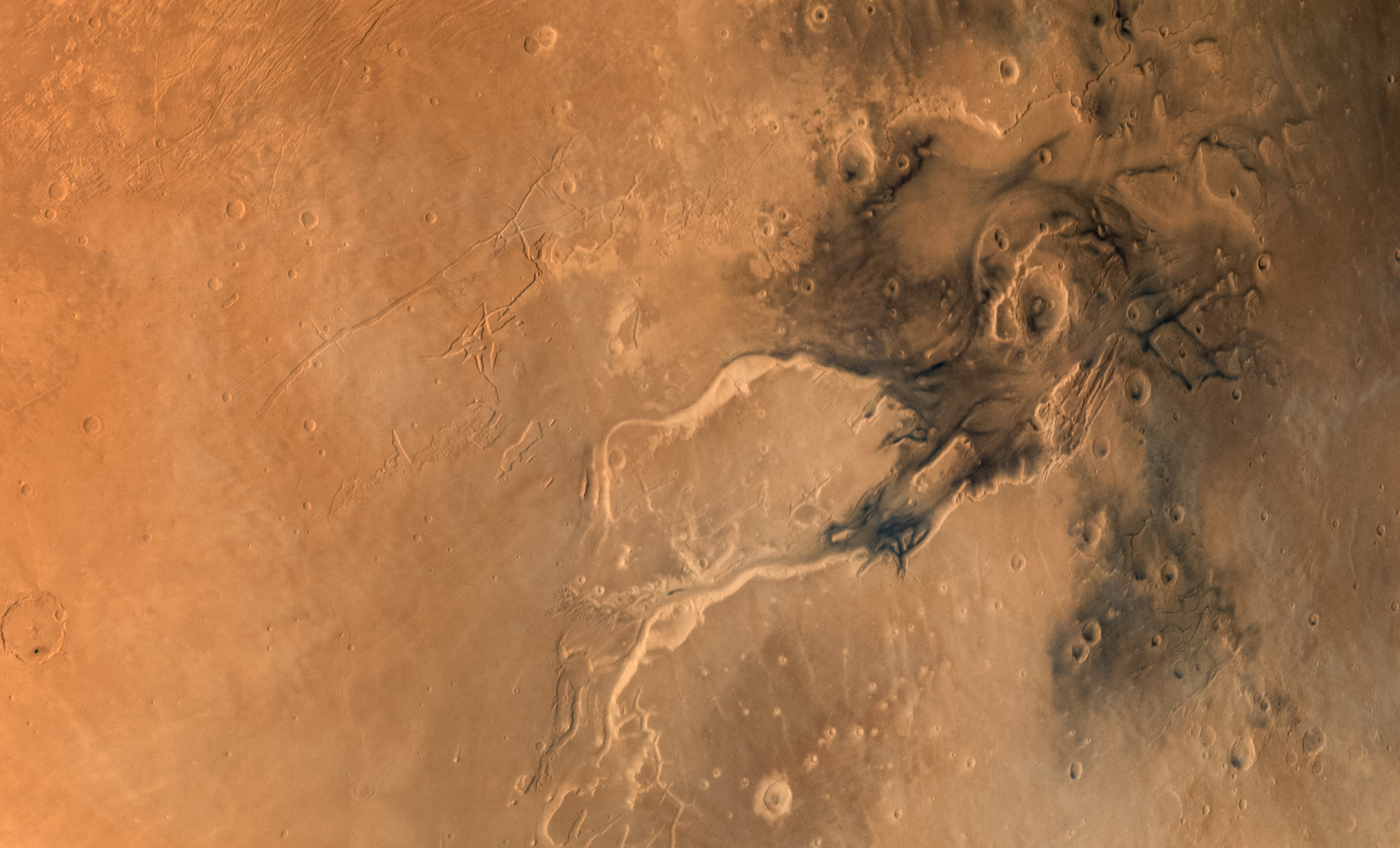
Kasei Valles

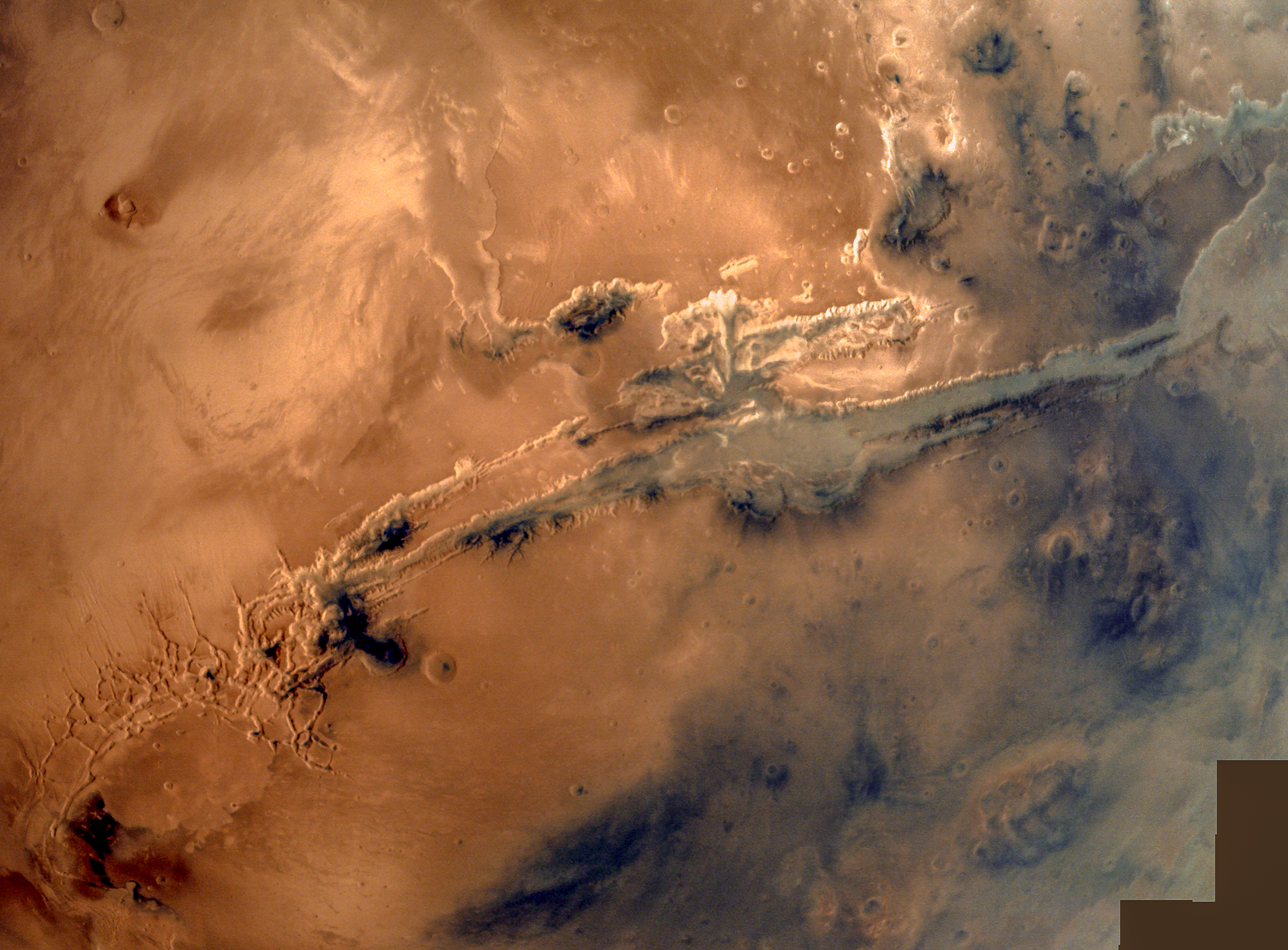
Valles Marineris

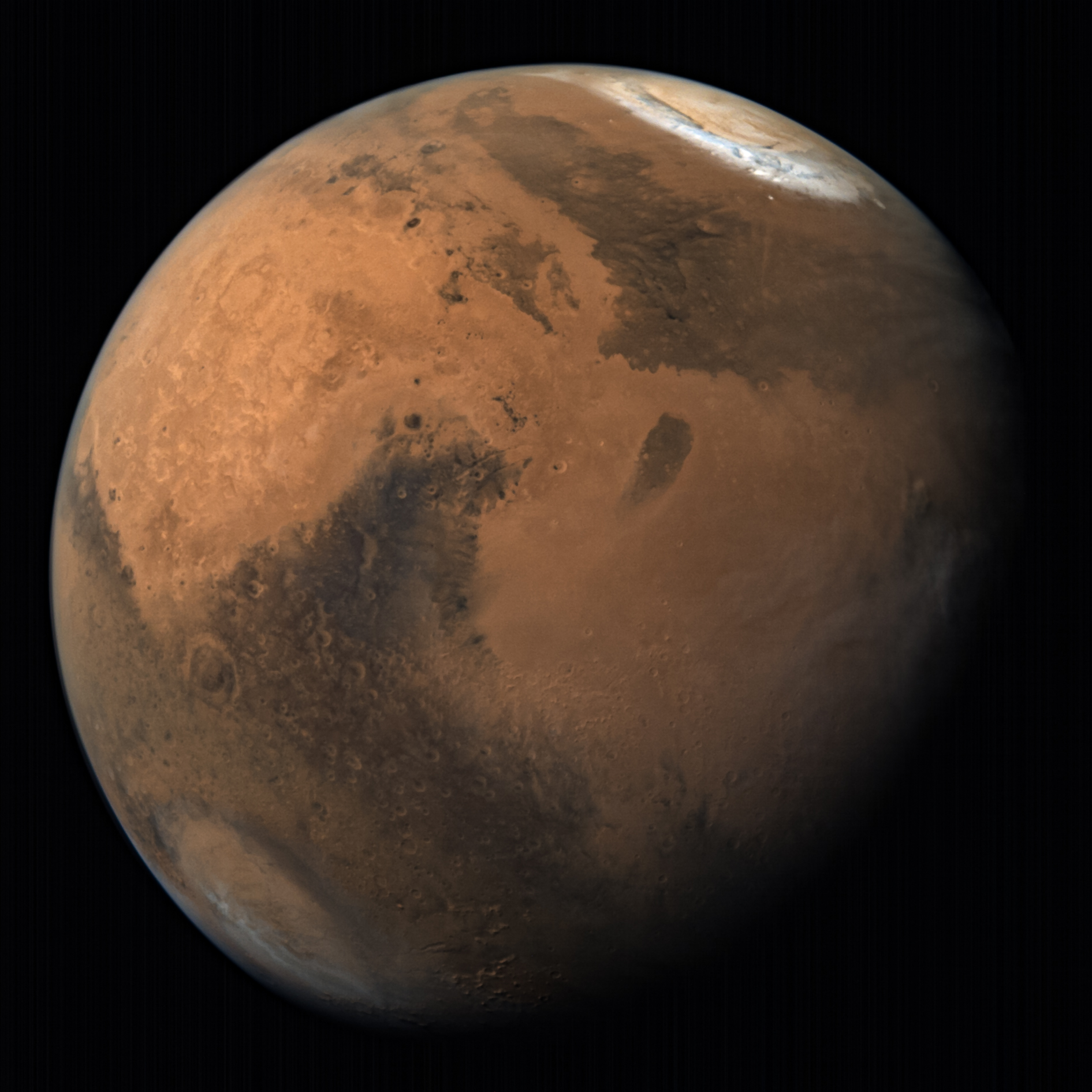

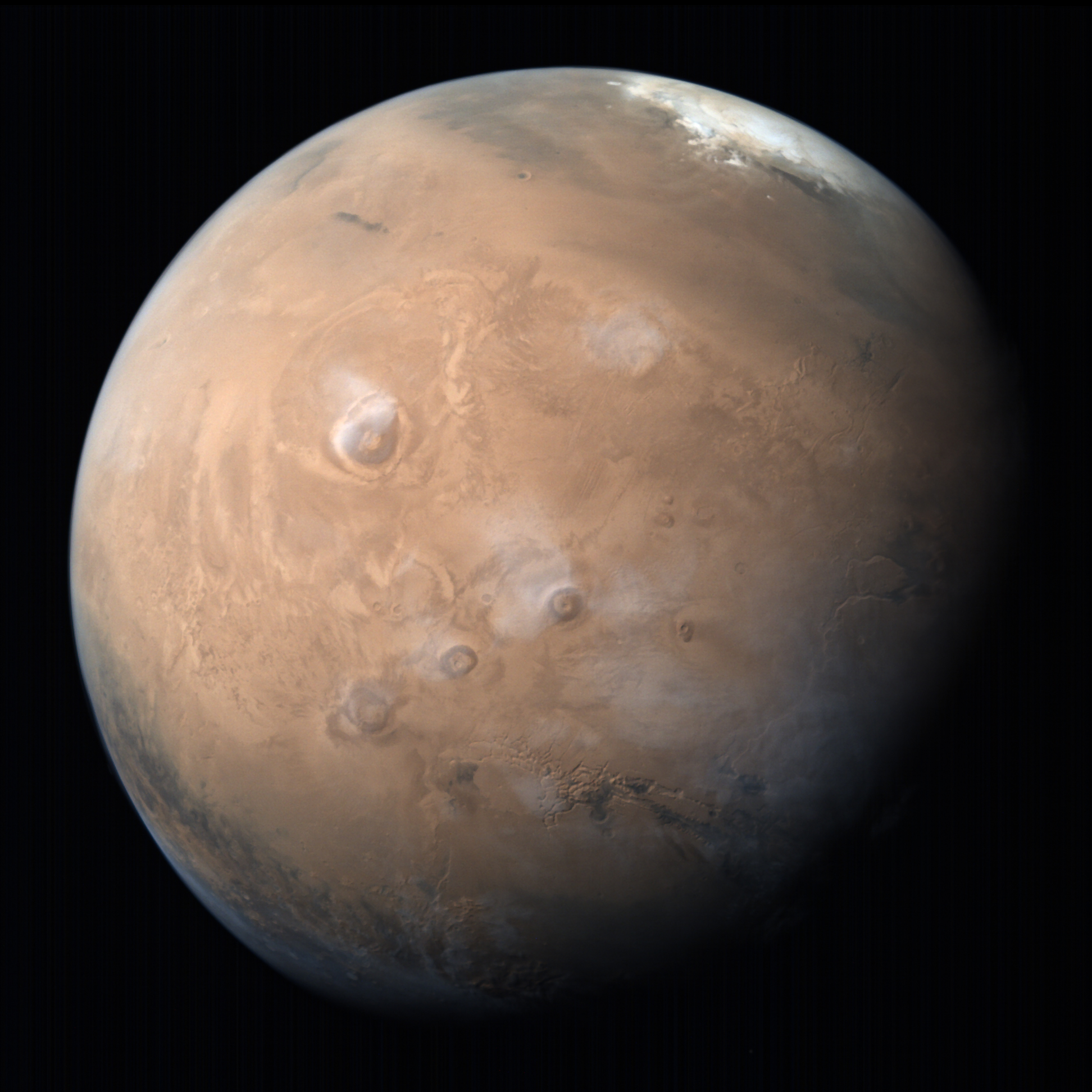

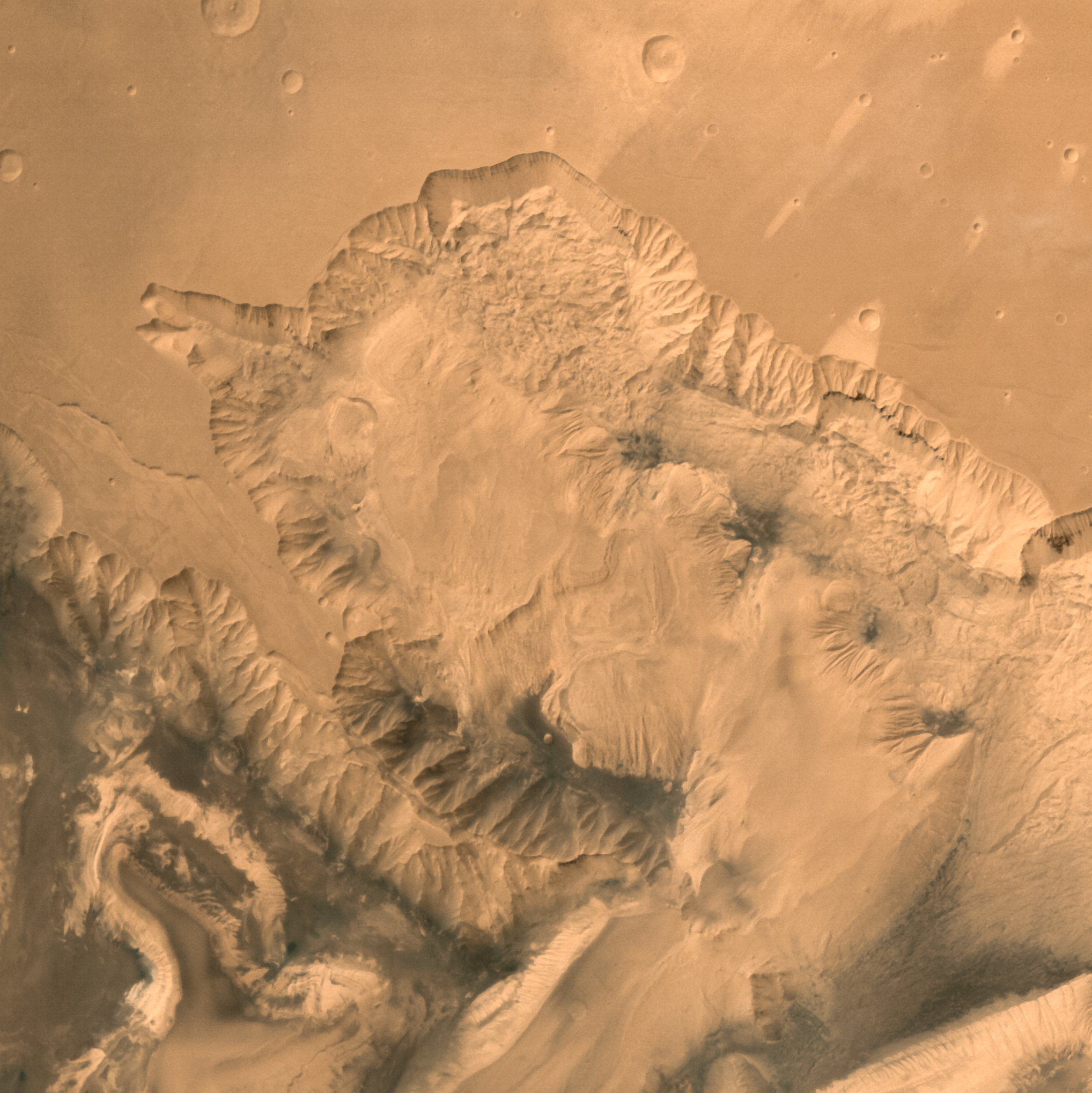
Valles Marineris

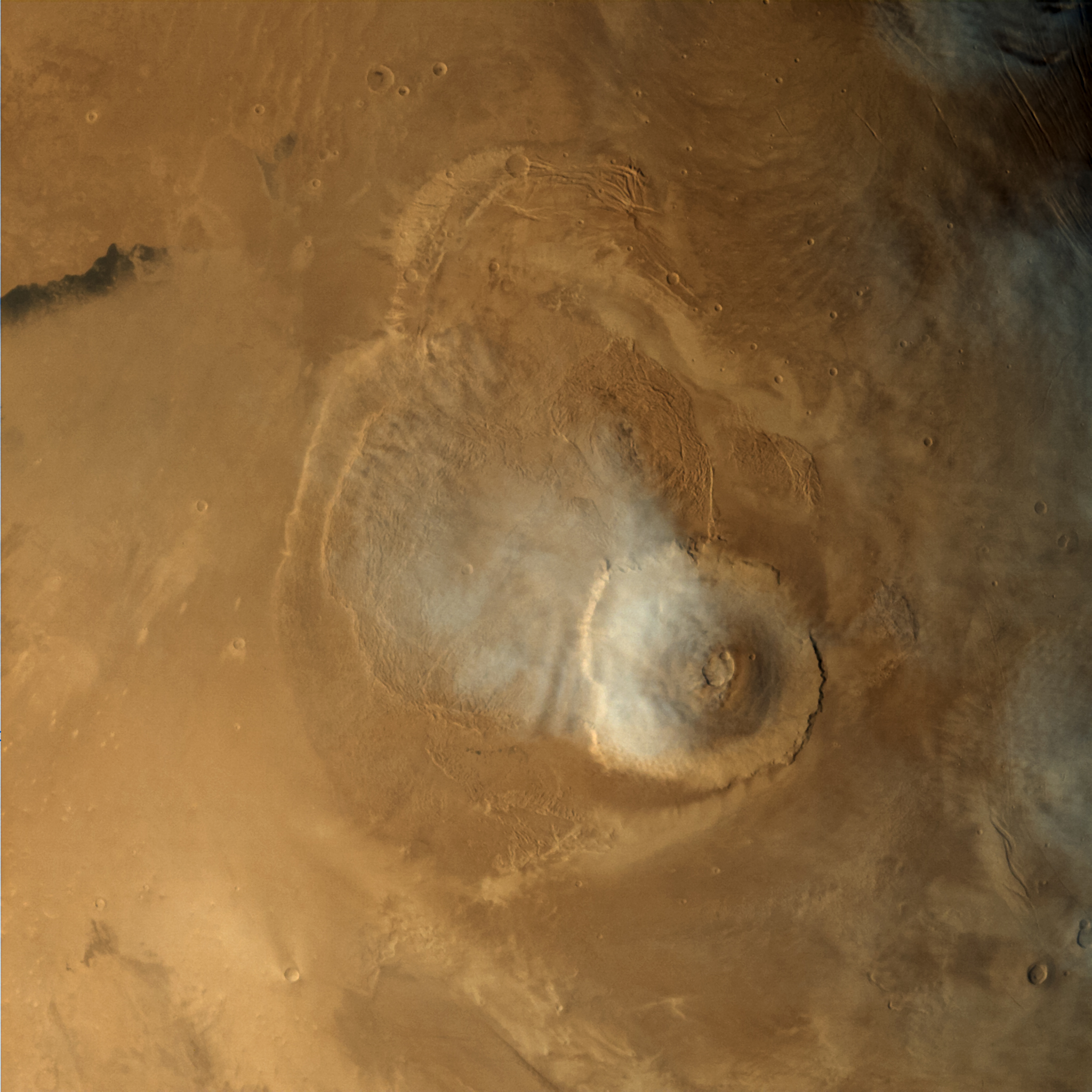
Olympus Mons

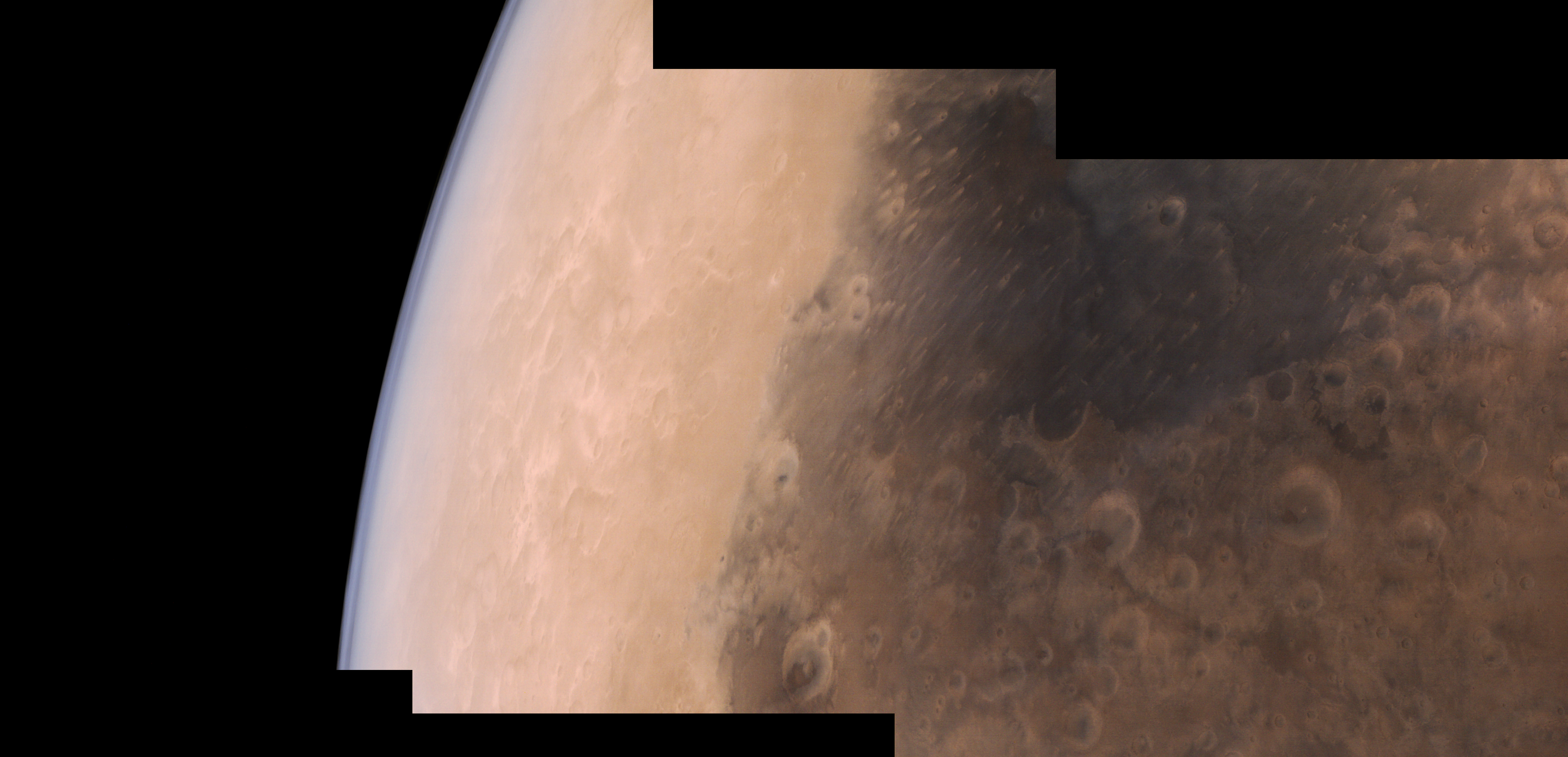
Syrtis Major Planum

== Results ==
=== Observation of suprathermal argon in exosphere ===
The Mars Exospheric Neutral Composition Analyser (MENCA) reported altitude profiles of argon-40 in the Martian exosphere from four orbits during December 2014 when the periapsis of the spacecraft was lowest. The upperlimit of the argon number density corresponding to this period is almost 5 x 10^{5}/cm^{3} at an altitude of 250 kilometres (160 mi) and the typical scale height is around 16 kilometres (9.9 mi) corresponding to an exospheric temperature of around 275 K (2 °C; 35 °F). However, on two orbits, the scale height over this altitude region is found to increase significantly making the effective temperature greater than 400 K (127 °C; 260 °F). The observations of Neutral Gas and Ion Mass Spectrometer (NGIMS) onboard the MAVEN also indicate that the change in slope in argon density occurs near the upper exosphere of around 230–260 kilometres (140–160 mi). These observations indicate significant suprathermal populations of carbon dioxide and argon in the Martian exosphere.

=== Global apparent short wave infrared albedo mapping ===
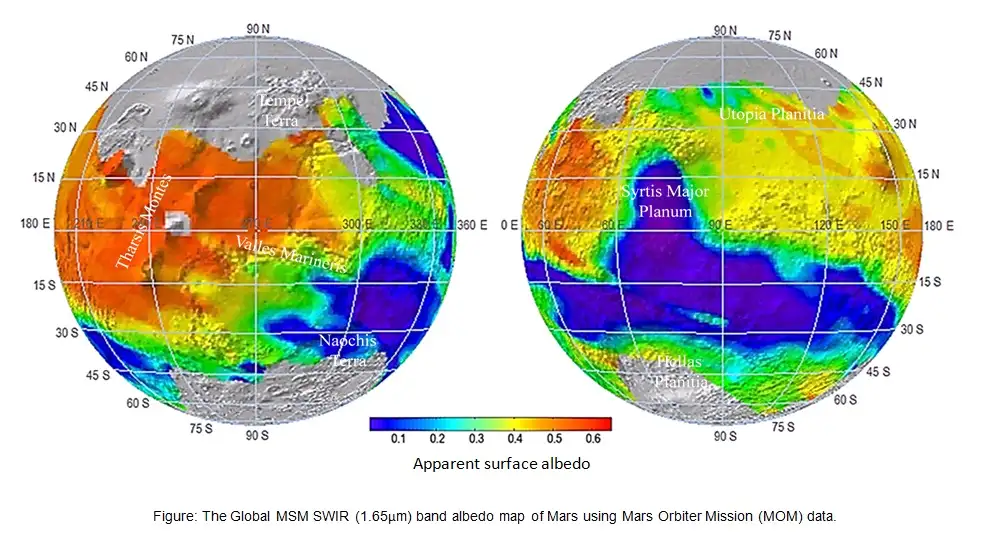
Global SWIR apparent albedo map obtained from MSM data

Global apparent short wave infrared (SWIR) albedo mapping of Mars was executed based on data acquired from the Methane Sensor for Mars (MSM) payload. The instrument is a differential radiometer in SWIR region of spectrum that measures reflected solar radiance in two SWIR (1.64 to 1.66 μm) channels. The first one is a methane channel which measures the absorption by methane and second one is a no absorption channel (reference channel). The reference channel data acquired from October 2014 to February 2015 was used for apparent SWIR albedo mapping. Data less than one degree of the limb of the planet was discarded to avoid atmospheric limb brightening and to ensure that the field of view was entirely on the planet. Data with incidence and zolar zenith angle greater than 60° was also discarded to reduce atmospheric effects.

The bright regions having an albedo greater than 0.4 are mainly localised over the Tharsis plateau, Arabia Terra, and Elysium Planitia and generally represent surface covered by dust while the low albedo of less than 0.15 are mainly localised over Syrtis Major Planum, Daedalia Planum, Valles Marineris and Acidalia Planitia. The low albedo is associated with dark surfaces having volcanic rock basalt as surface expostures. Weekly mean apparent albedo data over Syrtis Major Planum was recorded in a period of solar longitudes 205 to 282 (October 2014) during which dust activities are significant. A surge in mean albedo from the usual 0.2 to an erratically higher near 0.4 was recorded on solar longitude 225 which was possibly due to the local injection of dust into atmosphere. This matches with a similar albedo spike in the region during solar longitude of 280–290 recorded by Viking IRTM.

=== Neutral composition of evening time exosphere ===
The Mars Exosphere Neutral Composition Analyser (MENCA) during 18–29 December 2014 provided altitude profiles of three major constituents; carbon dioxide (amu 44), nitrogen molecule & carbon monoxide (amu 28) and atomic oxygen (amu 16) in the Martian exosphere. The measurements were taken from four orbits which were closest to Mars with a periapsis which varied from 262–265 kilometres (163–165 mi) during the evening time or close to sunset terminator hours to attain moderate solar activity conditions.

During evening hours the carbon dioxide density changes from 3.5 × 10^{7} cm to 1.5 × 10^{5}/cm^{3} for an altitude change of 100 kilometres (62 mi) in the exosphere. The number density of amu 28 is comparable to that of carbon dioxide (amu 44) at lower altitudes and exceeds above 275 kilometres (171 mi). The factor becomes almost 10 at 375 kilometres (233 mi). The atomic oxygen number density exceeds that of carbon dioxide above 270 kilometres (170 mi). At 335 kilometres (208 mi), this difference becomes a factor of 10, above which atomic oxygen far exceeds the abundance of carbon dioxide. The transition from carbon dioxide to atomic oxygen dominant exosphere is an important indicator of the solar EUV forcing. The mean exospheric temperature derived using the scale height values estimated from the observed partial pressure variation in the three mass channels is 271 ± 5 K (−2.15 ± 5.00 °C; 28.13 ± 9.00 °F). These first observations corresponding to the Martian evening hours is expected to provide constraints data to the thermal escape models.

=== Radio occultation experiment on solar corona ===
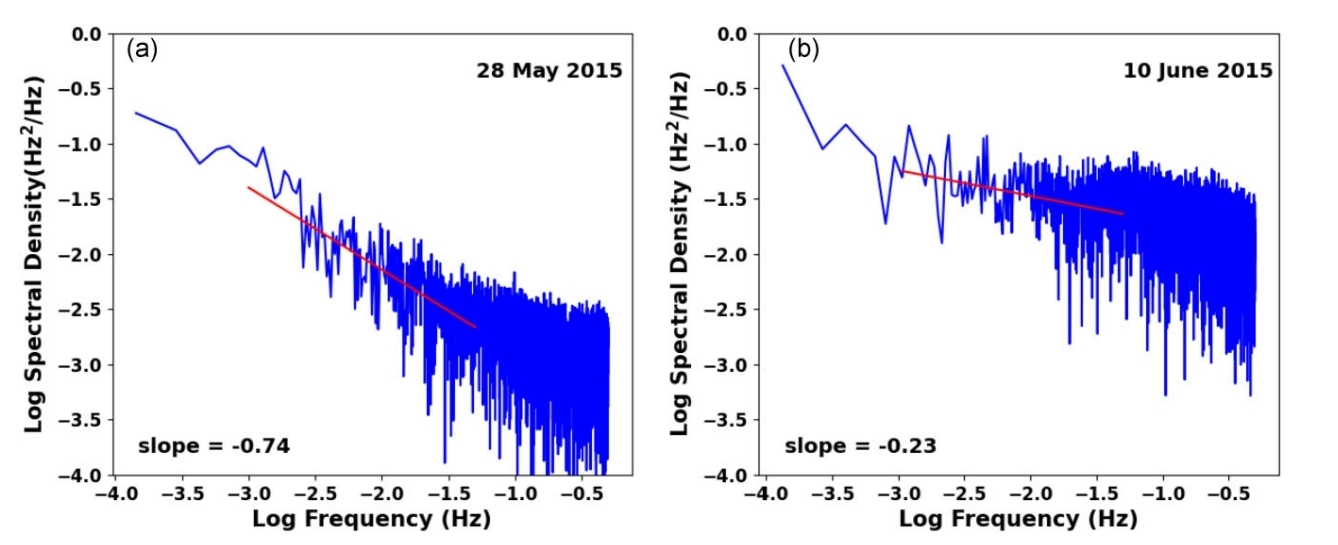
Frequency fluctuation spectrum of downlink signal

Radio occulation experiments were performed using S-band downlink signals from the spacecraft during the May–June 2015 (post-maxima of solar cycle 24) period when the Sun was between Earth and Mars along a line in the same elliptical plane. The downlink signals from the spacecraft of frequency 2.29 GHz passed through the solar coronal region at solar offset distances between 4–20 solar radius.

The experiment was conducted in a closed-loop one-way format at a sampling frequency of one hertz and the occultation geometry was such that the proximate ray path from the spacecraft to Earth covered a range of 5−39 degree heliolaltitudes. From observations with radio signals from the spacecraft, it is found that the turbulence power spectrum at larger heliocentric distances greater than 10 R_{☉} (18.17 R_{☉} on 28 May), the curve steepens with a spectral index of around 0.6−0.8. For smaller heliocentric distances of less than 10 R_{☉} (5.33 R_{☉} on 10 June), it displays flattening in lower-frequency regions with a spectral index of around 0.2−0.4, which corresponds to a solar wind acceleration region. A complimentary observation is that the higher-heliolatitude spectra appear to be flatter than lower-heliolatitude spectra.

The Chandrayaan-2 orbiter and the Mars Orbiter Mission orbiter would also conduct a joint series of Radio occultation measurements of each other's signals. This was used by mission scientists to analayse the lunar and solar wind plasma environments.

=== Atmospheric optical depth in the Valles Marineris ===
Stereo images of Valles Marineris acquired by Mars Colour Camera (MCC) payload along with the co-registered MOLA Digital Elevation Map (DEM) were used to calculate atmospheric optical depth (AOD) over northern and southern walls of Valles Marineris. On northern wall ranging from 62°W to 68°W, the red channel of MCC measured an AOD of 1.7 near the bottom of the valley and decreases monotonically to about 1.0 near the top, while the green channel measures an AOD of around 2.1 and similarly decreases monotonically with increasing altitude. Both measurements shows a clear relation that can be well fitted with an exponential curve. The calculated scale height of AOD equals to 14.08 kilometres (8.75 mi) and 11.24 kilometres (6.98 mi) for red and green channels respectively.

The red channel AOD measurement on the southern wall of Valles Marineris ranging from 62°W to 68°W remains nearly steady from 1.75 in the bottom of the valley to 1.85 near to the top and does not show a monotonic decline of AOD with altitude. From the AOD map overlaid on MCC image draped on MOLA DEM, it is clear that there is a mountain-like structure along the southern walls of the valley, which is expected to cause the creation of banner clouds in the lee side of the mountain or lee wave clouds. The AOD variation with altitude along the southern wall between the longitudes 57°W to 62°W where mountain structures are not present shows a normal monotonic decrease. This further supports the existence of lee wave clouds on the southern wall of Valles Marineris around 65°W.

== Status ==
The orbit insertion put MOM in a highly elliptical orbit around Mars, as planned, with a period of 72 hours 51 minutes 51 seconds, a periapsis of 421.7 km (262.0 mi) and apoapsis of 76,993.6 km (47,841.6 mi). At the end of the orbit insertion, MOM was left with 40 kg (88 lb) of fuel on board, more than the 20 kg (44 lb) necessary for a six-month mission.

On 28 September 2014, MOM controllers published the spacecraft's first global view of Mars. The image was captured by the Mars Colour Camera (MCC).

On 7 October 2014, the ISRO altered MOM's orbit so as to move it behind Mars for comet Siding Spring's flyby of the planet on 19 October 2014. The spacecraft consumed 1.9 kg (4 lb) of fuel for the manoeuvre. As a result, MOM's apoapsis was reduced to 72,000 km (45,000 mi). After the comet passed by Mars, ISRO reported that MOM remained healthy.

On 4 March 2015, the ISRO reported that the MSM instrument was functioning normally and are studying Mars's albedo, the reflectivity of the planet's surface. The Mars Colour Camera was also returning new images of the Martian surface.

On 24 March 2015, MOM completed its initial six-month mission in orbit around Mars. ISRO extended the mission by an additional six months; the spacecraft has 37 kg (82 lb) of propellant remaining and all five of its scientific instruments are working properly. The orbiter can reportedly continue orbiting Mars for several years with its remaining propellant.

A 17-day communications blackout occurred from 6 to 22 June 2015 while Mars's orbit took it behind the Sun from Earth's view.

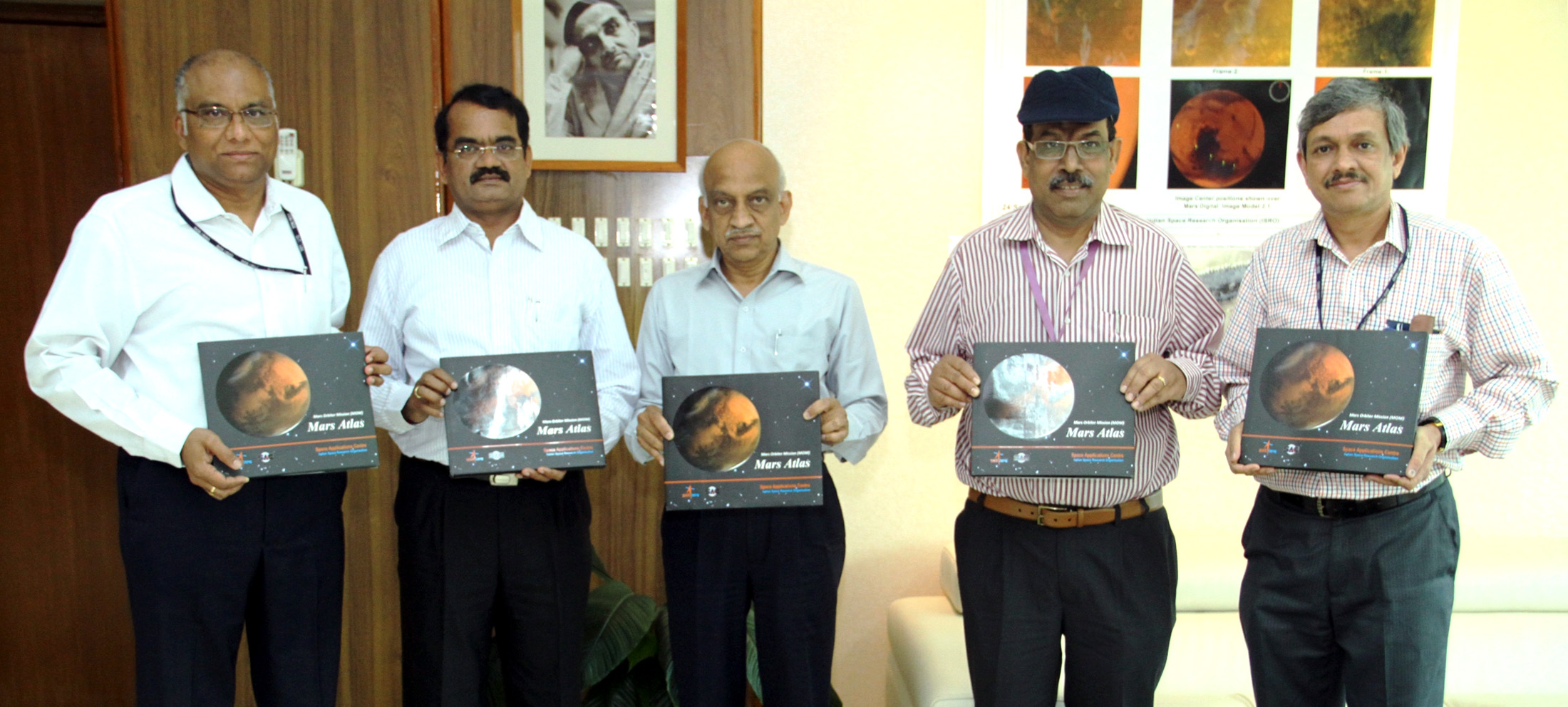
The chairman, ISRO, Shri A.S. Kiran Kumar releasing the Mars Atlas on the occasion of the completion of one year of Mars Orbiter Mission

On 24 September 2015, ISRO released its Mars Atlas, a 120-page scientific atlas containing images and data from the Mars Orbiter Mission's first year in orbit. It can be accessed here.

In March 2016, the first science results of the mission were published in Geophysical Research Letters, presenting measurements obtained by the spacecraft's MENCA instrument of the Martian exosphere.

During 18 to 30 May 2016, a communication whiteout occurred with Earth coming directly between Sun and Mars. Due to high solar radiation, sending commands to spacecraft was avoided and payload operations were suspended.

On 17 January 2017, MOM's orbit was altered to avoid the impending eclipse season. With a burn of eight 22 N thrusters for 431 seconds, resulting in a velocity difference of 97.5 metres per second (351 km/h) using 20 kilograms (44 lb) of propellant (leaving 13 kilograms [29 lb] remaining), eclipses were avoided until September 2017. The battery is able to handle eclipses of up to 100 minutes.

On 19 May 2017, MOM reached 1,000 days (973 sols) in orbit around Mars. In that time, the spacecraft completed 388 orbits of the planet and relayed more than 715 images back to Earth. ISRO officials stated that it remains in good health.

On 24 September 2018, MOM completed 4 years in its orbit around Mars, although the designed mission life was only six months. Over these years, MOM's Mars Colour Camera has captured over 980 images that were released to the public. The probe is still in good health and continues to work nominally.

On 24 September 2019, MOM completed 5 years in orbit around Mars, sending 2 terabytes of imaging data, and had enough propellant to complete another year in orbit.

On 1 July 2020, MOM was able to capture a photo of the Mars satellite Phobos from 4,200 kilometres (2,600 mi) away.

On 18 July 2021 Mars Colour Camera (MCC) captured full disc image of Mars from an altitude of about 75,000 kilometres (47,000 mi) with spatial resolution about 3.7 kilometres (2.3 mi).

In October 2022, ISRO announced that it had lost communications with MOM in April 2022, a time when the spacecraft faced increasingly longer duration eclipses, including a seven-hour long eclipse that it was not designed to withstand. ISRO said the spacecraft had likely run out of attitude control propellant and was therefore not recoverable.

== Recognition ==
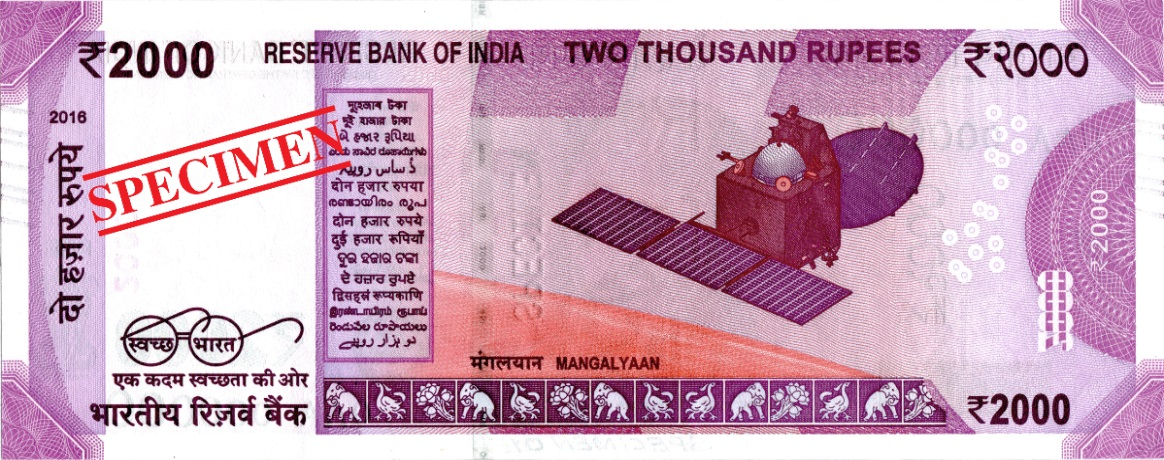
Illustration of Mars Orbiter Mission on the reverse side of Mahatma Gandhi New Series ₹2000 banknote

In 2014, China referred to India's successful Mars Orbiter Mission as the "Pride of Asia". The Mars Orbiter Mission team won US-based National Space Society's 2015 Space Pioneer Award in the science and engineering category. NSS said the award was given as the Indian agency successfully executed a Mars mission in its first attempt; and the spacecraft is in an elliptical orbit with a high apoapsis where, with its high resolution camera, it is taking full-disk colour imagery of Mars. Very few full disk images have ever been taken in the past, mostly on approach to the planet, as most imaging is done looking straight down in mapping mode. These images will aid planetary scientists.

An illustration of the Mars Orbiter Mission spacecraft is featured on the reverse of the ₹2,000 currency note of India.

An image taken by the Mars Orbiter Mission spacecraft was the cover photo of the November 2016 issue of National Geographic magazine, for their story "Mars: Race to the Red Planet".

== Follow-up mission ==
ISRO plans to develop and launch a follow-up mission called Mars Lander Mission (MLM), also called Mars Orbiter Mission 2 (MOM 2 or Mangalyaan-2) with a greater scientific payload to Mars in 2027. The orbiter will use aerobraking to reduce apoapsis of its initial orbit and reach an altitude more suitable for scientific observation.

== In popular culture ==
- The 2019 Hindi film Mission Mangal is loosely based on India's mission to Mars.
- A web series called Mission Over Mars is loosely based on India's Mars mission.
- Space MOMs, released online in 2019, is based on India's Mars mission.
- Mission Mars: Keep Walking India is a short film released in 2018 based on India's Mars mission.

== See also ==
- Department of Space – Indian government space program administrator
- ExoMars Trace Gas Orbiter – Mars orbiter, part of ExoMars programme
- Venus Orbiter Mission
- List of ISRO missions
- List of Mars orbiters
- List of missions to Mars
- Mars Express – European orbiter mission to Mars (2003–present)
