= Janamanchi Seshadri Sarma =

Indian poet

Janamanchi Seshadri Sharma
- జనమంచి శేషాద్రిశర్మ చిత్రపటం.

Background information
- Born: 1882; India
- Died: 1950 (aged 67–68)
- Occupation: Poet

Janamanchi Seshadri Sharma (1882–1950) was a Telugu poet from Cuddapah, Andhra Pradesh.

== Life ==
Janamanchi Seshadri Sharma was born in 1882 at Kaluvai in Nellore district. He took up a job in Cuddapah, but later moved to different places like Kashi, Vijayanagaram and Kasimkota near Anakapalli. He was learned in many shastras. He worked as Telugu pandit at many high schools, retiring finally from Municipal High School, Cuddapah.

== Honours ==
He earned several titles like 'Balasaraswathi', 'Abhinava Nannaparya', 'Abhinava Andhra Valmiki', 'Andhra Vyasa', Kalaprapoorna, 'Kavyathirtha', etc. and was a recipient of several honours.

He was honoured with Kalaprapoorna from Andhra University in 1937.

== Literary works ==
=== Translations ===
Seshadri Sharma translated the following works from Sanskrit into Telugu. In his translations he took care that the original idea was faithfully reproduced in Telugu. His style was simple and straight and he avoided lengthy phrases and long-winding sentences.

- Halasya mahatmyam
- Brahmanda Puranam
- Brahma Puranam
- Valmiki Ramayanam (Translated as Andhra Srimadramayanam),
- The tenth canto of Bhagavata Purana (Translated as Tandavakrishna Bhagavatam)
- Kaumarika khandam and Arunachala khandam from Skandapuranam

=== Original works ===
- Srimadandhra Lalitopakhyanam
- Hanumadvijaya
- Sarvamangala Parinayam
- Dharmasara Ramayanam
- Kalivilasam
- Satpravartnamu
- Sri Ramavatara Tatvamu
- Sri Krishnavatara Tatvamu
- Tandlata
- Vanajakshi

There are also a number of unpublished works to his credit like Pandavajnatam, Vichitra paduka pattabhishekam, Shrirama vanavasam.

== Notes ==
- 20th Century luminaries, Potti Sreeramulu Telugu University, Hyderabad, 2005.
