= Seshagiri Rao Vellanki =

Indian scientist (born 1953)

Dr Seshagiri Rao Vellanki
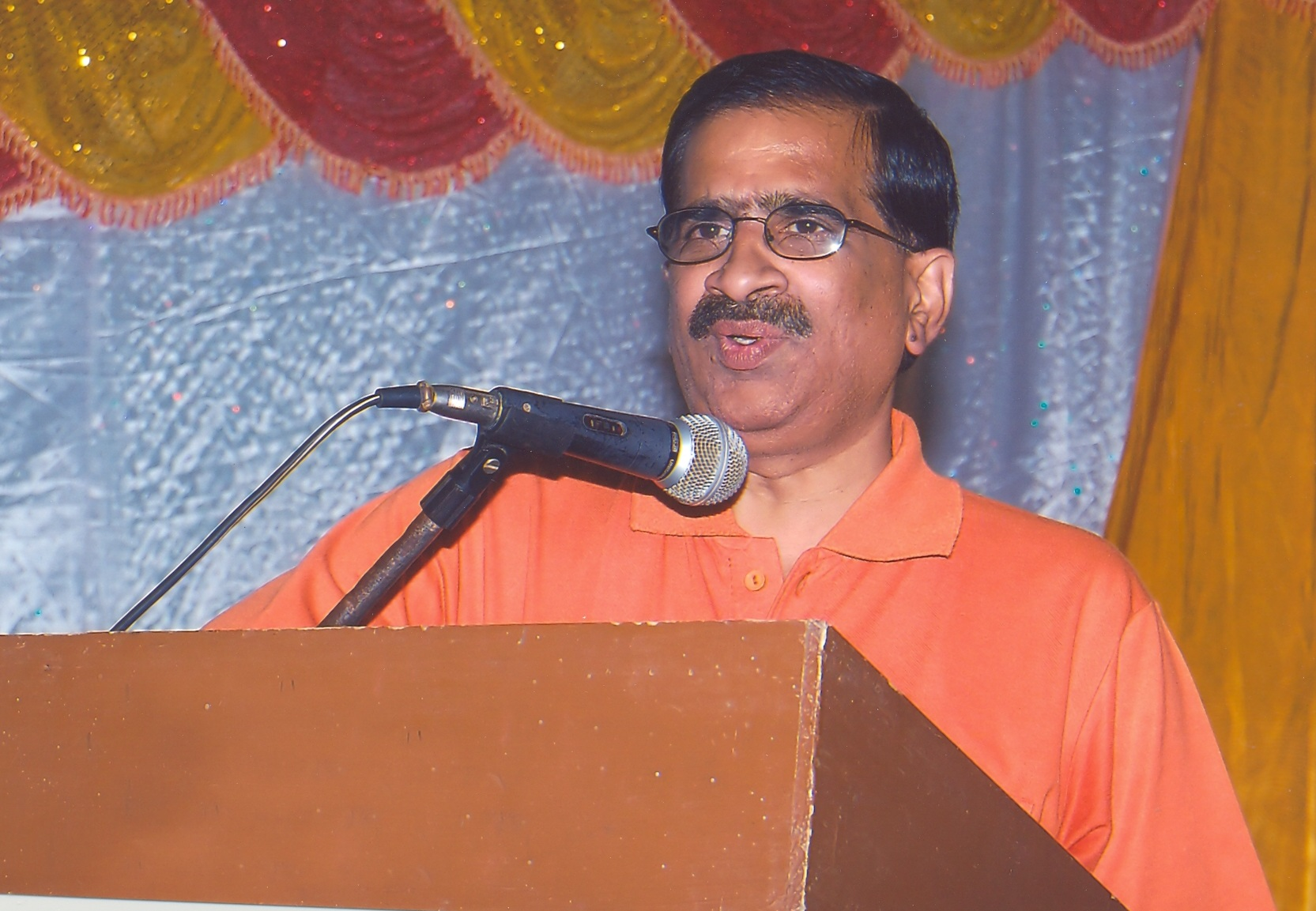
- Seshagiri Rao V in 2015
- Born: 10 January 1953 (age 73); Kolavennu, Vijayawada, Andhra Pradesh
- Scientific career
- Fields: Space research, Realtime Systems, Digital Signal Processing, Flight Safety, Computer Software, Radars
- Workplaces: ISRO

Notes
- Former Distinguished Scientist ISRO

Dr. Seshagiri Rao Vellanki is an Indian scientist and is former distinguished scientist and associate director of the Satish Dhawan Space Centre (SDSC), Indian Space Research Organisation (ISRO). He worked in ISRO for more than 39 years in various capacities. He also served in ISRO as Prof. Satish Dhawan for three years. He was instrumental in setting up state of the art Real Time Systems and computer networks for flight safety at SDSC SHAR. He also developed data processing software required for displaying flight trajectories. Pulse Coherent Mono-pulse Radars (PCMC) development and commissioning was carried out under his leadership. He also developed and implemented various algorithms required for wind profile estimation for weather monitoring. He worked extensively in Mission Simulations and Post flight trajectory estimation and data analytics.

He has worked as Deputy Director, Range Operations (RO), Deputy Director, Vehicle Assembly and Static Test (VAST) Facility. He also served as Controller SDSC SHAR. He contributed significantly to the Satellite recovery experiment, Chandrayan-1, Mangalyaan and many other missions. ISRO’s prestigious Multi Object Tracking Radar (MOTR) was designed, developed and commissioned under his guidance as Project Director. He is responsible for developing and implementing Software for Computerisation Of Working Administrative areas for ISRO in all centres. He has visited numerous colleges and universities to deliver motivational talks to students in science and technology.

== Personal life ==
Rao was born on 10 January 1953, in Kolavennu, a village in the Krishna District of Andhra Pradesh. He completed his schooling at Elementary school and Zilla Parishad High School at Kolavennu village in Telugu Medium. He completed his Pre-University Course (PUC) in 1969 at Andhra Christian College Guntur. He is a B.Sc. graduate from J.K.C College, Guntur in 1972. Later he completed his post-graduation M.Sc. (Physics – Electronics) from Andhra University, Visakhapatnam in 1974. He joined Andhra University as a Junior Research Fellow (JRF) and ultimately completed his Ph.D. degree at Sri Venkateshwara University, Tirupati.

Rao currently resides in Hyderabad, Telangana state, where he supports various academic, scientific and IT institutions in their research activities.

== Academic and research activities ==
He has authored and co-authored more than 60 papers in national and international journals, seminars and conferences.
