= Space industry of India =

Overview of Indian space sector

The space industry of India is predominantly driven by its national space agency ISRO. The industry includes over 500 private suppliers and other various bodies of the Department of Space (DoS) in all commercial, research and arbitrary regards. Since the Indian space sector was opened up to private sector in 2020, numerous private space companies have emerged, working on various aspects of space exploration. In 2023, the space industry of India accounted for US$9 billion or 2%–3% of the global space industry and employed more than 45,000 people. The Government of India projects industry to grow four to five times over the next 8–10 years, potentially reaching US$40–45 billion, global share targeted to rise to 8% by 2030.

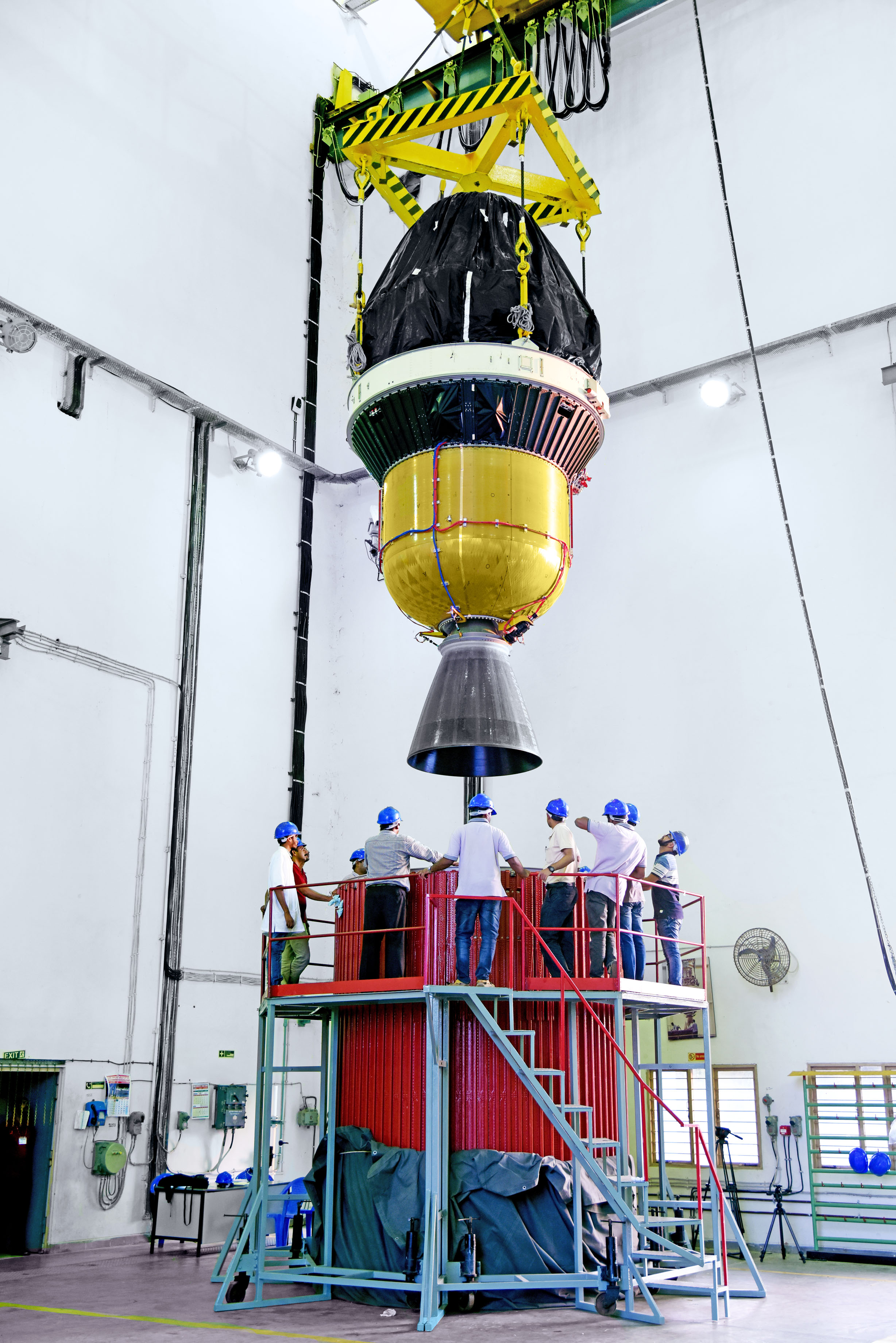
Integration of Polar Satellite Launch Vehicle underway

As of 2025, India has launched 434 satellites for various foreign countries. There were more than 300 space startups in India in mid 2025 involved in various stages of developing their own launch vehicles, designing satellites and other allied activities. By 2026, the industry had expanded over 440 startups and over 500 public limited and state-owned companies.

== History ==
=== Early decades ===
India's interest in space travel began in the early 1960s, when scientists launched a Nike-Apache rocket from Thumba Equatorial Rocket Launching Station (TERLS), Thiruvananthapuram. The Indian National Committee for Space Research was subsequently set up, which later became ISRO functioning under a new independent DoS in the 1970s under the Prime Minister of India. ISRO joined the Interkosmos program to launch its first satellite, Aryabhata, from the former Soviet Union in 1975.

SLV-3, a locally developed space rocket, was introduced in 1979, enabling India to undertake orbital launches. Experience gained from SLV-3 was used to develop ASLV to develop technologies for launching satellites in geostationary orbit, but this ended up having very limited success and was eventually discontinued. However, the study of a homegrown medium-lift launch vehicle went on, which lead to the realisation of the PSLV.

The Government of India forayed into space exploration when scientists started to launch sounding rockets from TERLS. The establishment of the space agency lead to the development of small launch vehicles SLV-3 and ASLV, followed by larger PSLV and GSLV rockets in the 1990s, which allowed India to shift larger payloads and undertake commercial launches for the international market. Private firms started to emerge later as subcontractors for various rocket and satellite components. Reforms liberalising the space sector and nondisclosure agreements came in the late 2010s, leading to the emergence of various private spaceflight companies.

=== Introduction of PSLV and commercial space missions ===
Antrix Corporation was set up in 1992 to market ISRO's technology, launch services and transfer technology to Indian private firms, dawning the commercial space sector in India. The PSLV rocket, introduced in 1993, enabled India to launch its polar satellites. Despite initial failures in its first two flights, PSLV had no further failures and emerged as ISRO's primary workhorse for launching domestic and foreign satellites. The development of GSLV and LVM3 subsequently began in the 1990s and 2000s to attain the capability to launch communication satellites. However, the launchers didn't become operational until decades later, as India initially faced a great problem in the development of cryogenic engines. Later, NewSpace India Limited (NSIL) replaced Antrix Corporation as the commercial arm of ISRO.

=== Mission DefSpace ===
The Defence Innovation Organisation (DIO), through its Innovations for Defence Excellence (iDEX) framework, has become a key catalyst in advancing India's indigenous defence and space innovation landscape. By bridging the gap between defence user requirements and private-sector innovation, DIO promotes dual-use technological development that supports both strategic and commercial applications. The launch of Mission DefSpace in October 2022 marked a significant milestone—uniting startups, MSMEs, and academia to co-develop solutions in satellite communication, Earth observation, Synthetic Aperture Radar (SAR), AI-driven geospatial analytics, and space situational awareness (SSA). With challenge-based funding, technology mentorship, and procurement-linked incentives, DIO's role has been instrumental in nurturing a sustainable ecosystem for India's growing space-defence industry.

Under the Mission DefSpace, several companies have signed agreements with DIO/iDEX to develop technologies critical for India's military and strategic space applications. For instance, Sisir Radar Pvt. Ltd., founded by former ISRO Director Tapan Misra, is developing an L- and P-band continuous-wave Synthetic Aperture Radar (SAR) payload along with an unfurlable, electronically steered antenna for small-satellite platforms—enhancing India's all-weather imaging and reconnaissance capabilities.

Similarly, Space Kidz India has taken up the challenge of designing CubeSat deployers for microgravity and small-satellite missions, supporting low-cost and rapid satellite deployment for defence and scientific applications. Kepler Aerospace Pvt. Ltd., another participant, is working on CubeSat-class satellite platforms designed for real-time surveillance and communication relays, demonstrating the diversity of innovation emerging through the DefSpace initiative.

Alongside these, firms such as Digantara, Antsys Innovations, SpacePixxel, GalaxEye Space, and InspeCity Space Laboratories are contributing across domains including space domain awareness, RF communications, and on-orbit servicing—collectively reinforcing India's goal of achieving self-reliance and strategic depth in space-defence technologies.

=== Emergence of the private sector ===
The Indian space programme emerged as an economic sector with government-backed investments with official institutions in the military and civilian administrations over decades of engineering. Over four decades, ISRO continued transferring technologies to small and medium enterprises (SMEs), leading to there being over 500 suppliers of various components in 2017.

India's IT industry started engaging in this sector in the 1990s. The Department of Space actively promoted the growth of the sector, leading to the establishment of the manufacturing of various systems. Large mapping projects for various civilian and military requirements were outsourced by the government, which drove the growth of India's private space sector. However, the private sector still played a supporting role, while the government continued to dominate the space sector.

In the late 2010s, a large number of startups started to emerge throughout the country with their own proposals and concepts to develop various satellite technologies and rockets.

A range of initiatives to deregulate the private space sector were introduced by Narendra Modi's cabinet in June 2020, and the Indian National Space Promotion and Authorisation Centre (IN-SPACe) was established for incubating technology into private firms, known as Non-Government Private Entities (NGPEs) by DOS. NGPEs were included as a crucial part of ISRO's Space Communication Policy draft issued in October 2020. As of 2021, a new Space Activities Bill and a space policy are being drafted by NALSAR Centre for Aerospace and Defence laws to regulate space manufacturing and the legal aspects of the industry in India.

In 2021, the Government of India launched the Indian Space Association (ISpA) to open the Indian space industry to private sectors and start-ups. Several private companies like Larsen & Toubro, Nelco (Tata Group), OneWeb, MapmyIndia, Walchandnagar Industries are founding members of this organisation. Lieutenant General Anil Kumar Bhatt was appointed as the Director General of ISpA.

An amendment was made in the FDI policy for space sector through a gazette notification dated 16 April 2024, called the Foreign Exchange Management (Non-debt Instruments) (Third Amendment) Rules, 2024. The liberalized entry routes under the amended policy are aimed at attracting potential investors in the Indian companies in space. As per them, up to 74% FDI for satellite manufacturing & operation, satellite data products and ground segment & user segment are allowed under automatic route. Beyond 74% these activities are under government route. FDI up to 49% is allowed for launch vehicles and associated systems or subsystems, creation of spaceports for launching and receiving spacecraft are under automatic route but beyond 49% government permission would be required. The cabinet on 21 February had allowed 74% foreign direct investment (FDI) under automatic route for satellite manufacturing, up to 49% under automatic route for launch vehicles, and up to 100% under automatic route for manufacturing of components and systems. The new rules will come into effect from 16 April 2024. Throughout this time, various nondisclosure agreements and tech transfers have been taking place between ISRO and private entities.

In July 2024, Minister of Finance Nirmala Sitharaman announced that the Indian government will form a US$119 million venture capital find for space startups in India. The Union Cabinet of India approved the creation of the venture capital fund in October 2024. India has more than 400 private space enterprises as of 2024, up from 54 in 2020. Since 2025, an increasing number of private sector Indian space companies have been setting up offices and forming subsidiaries in the United States to gain access to the American market and compete with domestic U.S. space companies. Some Indian companies, including Bellatrix Aerospace, a satellite propulsion manufacturer, are establishing manufacturing facilities in the U.S.

As of May 2025, India is planning to launch 52 spy satellites over the next five years, with private sector companies building half of the 52 spy satellites, with ISRO manufacturing the remaining half. Additionally as of May 2025, technology for ISRO's SSLV is in the process of being transferred to private firms by ISRO.

On 18 July 2026, the launch of Vikram-1 was successful, with mission meeting all it's objectives and deploying payload at an altitude of 453 km (281 mi). Skyroot Aerospace became the first private Indian company to successfully reach the space in first attempt. This made India the third country in world after the U.S. and China to have rocket launch by private company.

== Industry overview ==
ISRO and DoS continue to remain dominant in the national space sector, having launched more than 100 domestic and more than 300 foreign satellites for 33 countries, while private firms have gradually been gaining ground. In 2019, the space industry of India accounted for US$7 billion or 2% of the global space industry and employed more than 45,000 people. Antrix Corporation expects the industry to grow up to US$50 billion by 2024 if provided with appropriate policy support.

In February 2020, there were 35 startups that came up in the space sector, of which three focused on designing rockets, 14 on designing satellites, and the rest on drone-based applications and services sector. The number further grew to over 40 in January 2021. Two companies, Skyroot Aerospace and AgniKul Cosmos have launched their own sounding rocket. Skyroot is planning the first launch of its Vikram-1 rocket in 2026, while AgniKul Cosmos is in advanced stages of developing its Agnibaan launch vehicle.

The space industry has contributed US$60 billion to India's gross domestic product (GDP) between 2014 and 2024. It created 96,000 direct jobs and 4.7 million indirect jobs, according to the Socio-Economic Impact Analysis of Indian Space Programme Report. India now has the eighth-largest space economy in the world, with space sector earnings reaching US$6.3 billion as of 2023.The Indian economy has benefited from a multiplier effect of US$2.54 for every dollar earned by the Indian space industry according to the European consulting firm Novaspace, with India's space industry workforce being 2.5 times more productive than the country's wider industrial workforce. At a compound annual growth rate (CAGR) of 6%, the Indian space economy which is valued at approximately ₹81,050.63 crore (US$8.4 billion) as of 2024 is projected to reach US$13 billion by 2025, accounting for 2% to 3% of the worldwide space economy. The entire amount of money invested in ISRO over the past 55 years since its founding is less than NASA's annual budget. Compared to CNSA, which receives over US$18 billion, and NASA, which works with a budget surpassing $25 billion, ISRO's annual budget in 2024 is approximately US$1.6 billion.

India's space industry aims to focus on various niches in the space domain, which include retrieving space data, constructing small satellites and cheap launches into orbit.

== List of notable organisations and companies ==
=== Major organisations and conglomerates ===
Name	Established	Ownership	Services	Portal
ISRO	1969	State-owned	Launch vehicles; Rocket engines; Satellites; Spacecraft; Technology; Rocket boosters	
Hindustan Aeronautics Limited	1964	State-owned	Transport aircraft; Fighter aircraft; Helicopters; Crew capsule (Gaganyaan)	
Ananth Technologies	1992	Private	Avionics; AIT of Launch Vehicles; Satellite Systems; Satellite applications	
Data Patterns (India) Ltd	1985	Private	Satellite systems; Small Satellites; Ground Stations	
Antrix Corporation	1992	State-owned	Satellite systems; Launch vehicles; Technology and consultancy	
Godrej Aerospace	1897	Private	Rocket engines; Spacecraft thrusters	
Larsen & Toubro	1938	Private	Rocket boosters; Spacecraft; Space infrastructure	
NewSpace India Limited	2019	State-owned	Satellite systems; Launch vehicles; Technology and consultancy	

=== Private launch providers ===
Company Name	Established	Ownership	Vehicle(s)	Reusability	Services	Portal
Skyroot Aerospace	2018	Private	Vikram-S; Vikram-I; Vikram-II	Partial (planned)	Launch vehicles	
AgniKul Cosmos	2017	Private	Agnibaan SOrTeD; Agnibaan	Partial (planned)	Launch vehicles	

=== Other notable companies and startups ===
Name	Established	Ownership	Services	Portal
Bellatrix Aerospace	2015	Private	Satellite propulsion systems	
GalaxEye	2021	Private	Earth observation satellites, coming SAR & Optical bands	[79]
Sisir Radar	2021	Private	Synthetic Aperture Radar (SAR) - P, L & X Band; Hyperspectral imaging; Multi-Payload Remote Sensing Satellites; Foliage penetration (FOPEN) radar; Ground Penetrating Radar (GPR); Satellite Ground Stations	
Spacekawa Explorations Pvt Ltd	2019	Private	Earth-observation & RF/geospatial analytics (Kawa Space); Satellite mission-planning / onboard autonomy systems; Antenna frequency-switching & payload control	
Digantara Research and Technologies Pvt. Ltd.	2018	Private	Space Domain Awareness (SDA/SSA); Orbital debris tracking & traffic management services; Space operations infrastructure & data platforms	
Antsys Innovations Pvt Ltd	2019	Private	RF & antenna systems; test & measurement solutions; Additive-manufactured antenna & gimbal platforms	
Omnipresent Robot Technologies Pvt. Ltd	N/A	Private	Industrial UAV/robotics & video analytics; Change-detection and inspection solutions	
Jisnu Communications Pvt Ltd	N/A	Private	Antenna control units & servo/drive systems; Ground-station pedestals and motion controllers	
MMRFIC Technology Pvt Ltd	N/A	Private	RF/MMIC components & subsystems (L/S/X/Ku/Ka); High-power Ka-band SSPAs for ground stations	
InspeCity Space Laboratories Pvt. Ltd.	N/A	Private	In-orbit servicing (ISAM): refuelling, repairs, life-extension; Robotic arms; proximity ops; laser-based ISAM R&D	
Avantel Limited	1990	Public	Defence SATCOM terminals & networks (naval/air/ground); SDRs, VSAT/INMARSAT services; network-centric solutions	
Parachute Technologies Pvt Ltd	N/A	Private	Spatial-AI & autonomy; defence/civil intelligent systems; (PNT anti-spoofing/anti-jamming: not independently verified)	
BigCat Wireless Pvt Ltd	2013	Private	5G/NTN radio units & MIMO-SDR platforms (O-RAN/eCPRI); SDR modems; below-noise-floor/advanced waveforms R&D	
TSC Technologies Pvt Ltd	N/A	Private	Portable SATCOM terminals & rugged integration; (Independent details limited)	N/A
Krisemi Design Technologies Pvt Ltd	N/A	Private	On-board GEO processing & beam-switching concepts; Ku/Ka-band HTS payload engineering (unverified)	N/A
Azista Space	2016	Private	Multiband SDRs (UHF/S/C/Ku/Ka) for platforms; (Independent details limited)	
Astrome Technologies	2015	Private	E-band multi-beam backhaul (GigaMesh) for 5G/NTN; mmWave/terahertz wireless; SATCOM backhaul expansion	
Kepler Aerospace Pvt Ltd	2018	Private	Small-sat/ADCS subsystems; AIS/ADS-B cubesat concepts; RF power amps (SSPA/TWTA/MPM); ELINT/IMINT projects	
Optimized Electrotech Pvt. Ltd.	2017	Private	Electro-optical long-range surveillance systems; Defence ISR payloads and imaging platforms	
Space Kidz India	2011	Private	Student satellites & STEM programmes; CubeSat deployers; education outreach	
Catalyx Space	2024	Private	Satellites; Reentry capsules; Ground stations	
Dhruva Space	2012	Private	Satellites	
Spaceover Corp	2023	Private	Research	
Pixxel	2019	Private	Earth imaging satellites	
Satellize	2018	Private	Satellites	
Manastu Space	2017	Private	Satellites and spacecraft components; Satellite propulsion systems and thrusters; Propellants; Safety systems; Spacecraft refueling; Life-extension; D-orbiting	
Grahaa Space	2021	Private	Stackable nanosatellite design and development; Nanosatellite engineering and components; Payload design and development; Launch services; Satellite ground station Services; Interplanetary exploration	
Erisha Space	2022	Private	Satellites and Satellite Launch Vehicles; Satellite propulsion systems and thrusters; Propellants; Safety systems; Drones; Ground stations; Satellite applications	
Acceleron Aerospace	2023	Private	Interplanetary satellites; Interplanetary exploration; Human mission to Mars and Ceres	
Akashalabdhi Pvt. Ltd.	2023	Private	Antariksh HAB; Inflatable Solar Arrays; Orbital MVP; Analogue Studies	
Astrogate Labs	2017	Private	Astro-link; Optical ground station as a service (OGSaaS); Defense and aerospace solutions	
Olee Space	2023	Private	Free-Space Optical Communication; Space-Based Networking; Quantum-Encrypted Networking; Directed Energy Weapons	
Eon Space Labs	2021	Private	Satellite payload development; Aerial imaging solutions (UAV/Drone Payloads); Ground-based surveillance platforms	

== See also ==
- List of private spaceflight companies
- List of Indian satellites
- List of foreign satellites launched by India
- Commercialization of space
- Space manufacturing
- Space colonisation
- Defence industry of India
- Economy of India

== Sources ==
- Pardoe, Geoffrey Keith Charles (1987). Space Industry International: Markets, Companies, Statistics and Personnel. Longman. ISBN 978-0-582-00314-9.
- Sadeh, Eligar (2013). Space Strategy in the 21st Century: Theory and Policy. Routledge. ISBN 978-1-136-22623-6. Archived from the original on 6 March 2016.
- Rajagopalan, Rajeshwari Pillai; Prasad, Narayan (2017). Space India 2.0: Commerce, Policy, Security and Governance Perspectives. Observer Research Foundation. ISBN 978-81-86818-28-2.
