= Indian Space Association =

Space industry association in India

- Abbreviation: ISpA
- Formation: 11 October 2021; 5 years ago
- Type: Industry association
- Headquarters: New Delhi, India
- Region served: India
- Services: Business promotion; Networking; Policy reforms
- Chairman: Jayant Patil
- Director General: Lt Gen. Anil Kumar Bhatt (Retd.)
- Website: www.ispa.space

Indian Space Association (ISpA) is an industry association for Indian space and satellite manufacturing companies. ISpA is a voluntary association of leading space industries in India. It was established with the objective of providing advisory and advocacy support to the space industry in India. The primary function of ISpA is to articulate the views of the industry on space sector reforms and provide guidance for a space industry in India.

== History ==
On October 11, 2021, Prime Minister of India Narendra Modi launched the Indian Space Association as a “single-window” agency for facilitating space sector business opportunities for Indian start-ups and the private sector.

== Members ==
ISpA members are divided into five categories; founding members, core members, associate members, start-up members and other members. It is listed below in alphabetical order;

=== Founding members ===
- Alpha Design Technologies
- Bharti Airtel
- Larsen & Toubro
- MapmyIndia
- Nelco (Tata Group)
- Eutelsat OneWeb
- Walchandnagar Industries

=== Core members ===
- Ananth Technologies
- Astra Microwave Products
- Azista-BST Aerospace
- Bharat Forge
- Centum Electronics
- Godrej Group
- Hughes Communications India
- IPSTAR India
- Viasat

=== Associate members ===
- Apex Technology
- AstroWorks Ventures LLC
- Avantel
- Axon Interconnecters and Wires
- BAE Systems India
- BEML
- Bharat Electronics
- Broadcast Engineering Consultants India
- Capella Space
- Esri India
- Hindustan Aeronautics Limited
- ICEYE
- LeoLabs
- Nibe Space
- NorthStar Earth & Space
- Planet Labs
- Samtel Avionics
- SES
- Tata Advanced Systems
- Tata Consultancy Services
- Vantor

=== Start-up members ===
- AgniKul Cosmos
- Aidin Technologies
- Altz Technologies
- ANVIKSHIKI SARVAJNA
- Astrobase Space Technologies
- Astrogate
- Astrome Technologies
- AugSense Lab
- Aule Space
- Bellatrix Aerospace
- BES Space
- BosonQ PSI
- Caliche Pvt Ltd
- CI Metrix
- Cyran AI Solutions
- C14
- Dhruva Space
- Digantara
- Elena Geo Systems
- GalaxEye Space
- Geo Solutions India
- Indian Technology Congress Association
- Inspecity
- KaleidEO Space Systems
- Kawa Space
- Kepler Aerospace
- Kristellar Aerospace
- KSPACE (Kerala Spacepark)
- Maan Defence
- Manastu Space Technologies
- Micronet Solutions
- Omspace Rocket and Exploration
- Omnipresent
- OnEarth Space TS
- OrbitAid
- Orbix Global
- Piersight
- Pixxel
- Robinsons Cargo & Logistics
- Saankhya Labs
- Samkalpa Systems
- SatLeo Labs
- SISIR Radar
- SkyMap Global
- Skyroot Aerospace
- SkyServe
- Spacefields
- Space Machines Company
- Suhora Technologies
- Sunrise Ventures
- Upgraha Space Technologies
- Vihaan SpaceTech
- Xovian Aerospace

=== Other members ===
- Space Kidz India
- Magnetar Space Club

== See also ==
- Indian Space Research Organisation
- IN–SPACe
- Space industry of India
