= PSLV-C55 =

Indian satellite launch mission

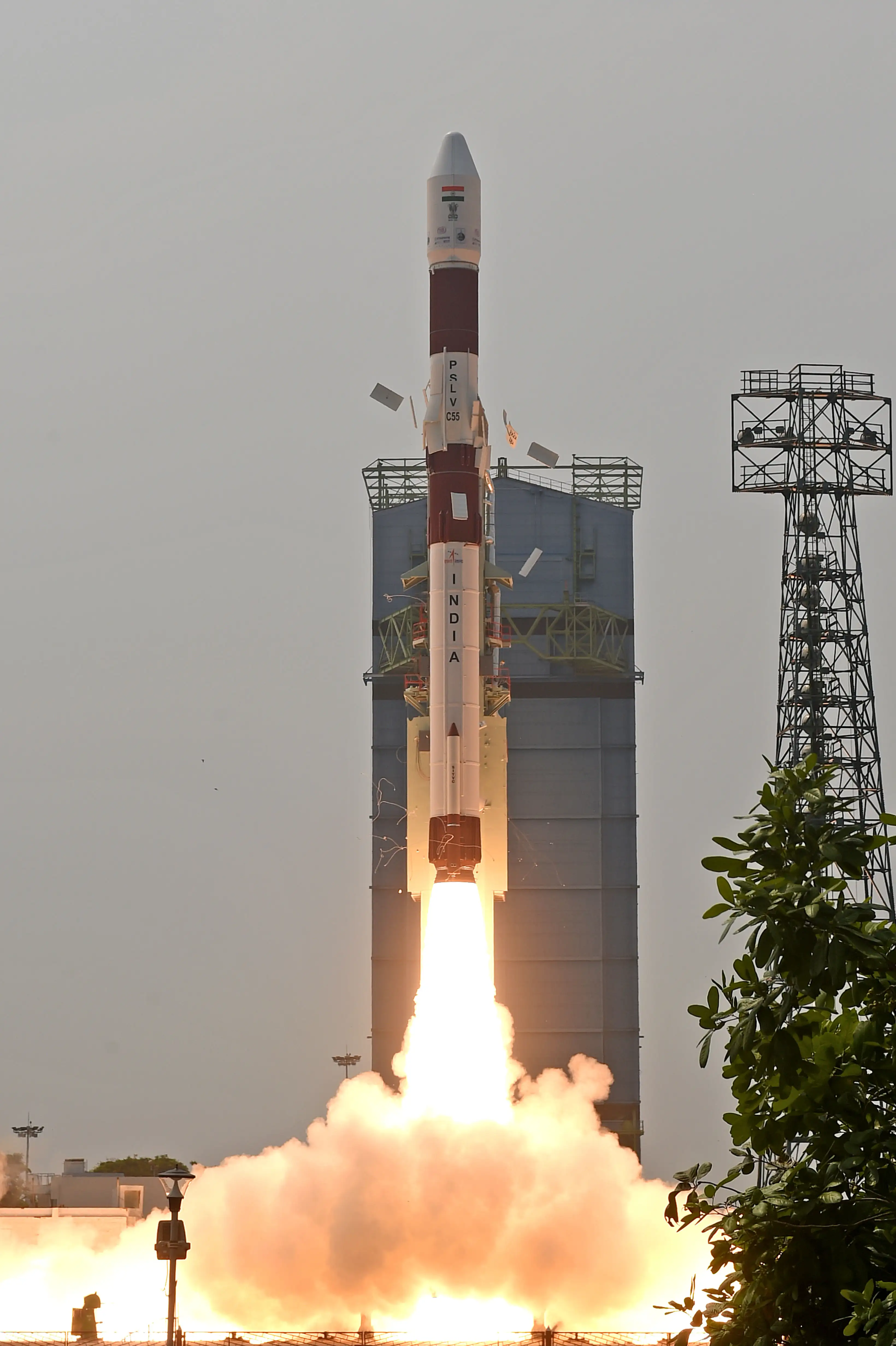
- PSLV - C55 lifts off on First Launch Pad

launch
- Launch: 22 April 2023; 08:49 (UTC)
- Pad: First Launch Pad Satish Dhawan Space Centre
- Payload: (Singapore) TeLEOS-2 (Singapore) Lumelite-4 (India) 7× smaller payloads hosted on POEM-2 (PSLV Orbital Experimental Module-2)

PSLV launches

The PSLV-C55 was the 57th mission of Indian Space Research Organisation's Polar Satellite Launch Vehicle (PSLV) and the 16th flight of the PSLV-CA variant. It successfully delivered the TeLEOS-2 and Lumelite-4 payloads to their intended orbits.

== Mission overview ==
The mission was a dedicated commerlaunch through NSIL with TeLEOS-2 as primary satellite and Lumelite-4 as a co-passenger satellite weighing 741 kg and 16 kg respectively. Both satellites belong to Singapore.

This also marks the third time that PS4 is used after satellite separations as a platform for experiments. There are non-separable payloads mounted on MSA (multi-satellite adapter). Payloads are powered on by a command after all satellites are separated. The orbital platform will remain in the same orbit achieved at the end of PS4 tank passivation after the primary mission. It has an expected life of 1 month.

As a part of POEM-2 (PSLV Orbital Experimental Module), there are seven experimental non-separable payloads:

- PiLOT (PSLV In orbitaL Obc and Thermals) OBC package from IIST
- OBC package from IIST
- ARIS-2 (Advanced Retarding Potential analyser for Ionospheric Studies) experiment from IIST
- HET based ARKA200 Electric Propulsion System from Bellatrix Aerospace
- DSOD-3U and DSOD-6U deployer units along with DSOL-Transceiver in S- & X- bands from Dhruva Space
- Starberry Sense Payload from Indian Institute of Astrophysics (IAP)

Mission Characteristics
Parameter	Orbit-1
Semi-Major Axis (km)	6964
Alt (km)	586
Eccentricity	0.0
Inclination (deg.)	10.00
Launch Pad	FLP
Launch Azimuth (deg.)	104

== Vehicle Characteristics ==
The PSLV C55 rocket has four stages; each one was self-contained, with its own propulsion system, thereby capable of functioning independently. The first and third stages used composite solid propellants, while the second and fourth stage use earth-storable liquid propellant. Stage 1 is Composite Solid employing (HTBP based) propellants. Stage 2 is a Earth Storable Liquid stage using (UDMH and N_{2}O_{4}). Stage 3 is a Composite Solid stage using (HTBP based) propellants. Stage 4 is a Earth Storable Liquid upper stage fueled with (MMH and MON3).

== Launch ==
It was launched on Saturday, 22 April 2023 at 14:19 IST / 08:49 UTC from Satish Dhawan Space Centre, Sriharikota, Andhra Pradesh, India.
