= AgniKul Cosmos =

Indian private aerospace company

AgniKul Cosmos Private Limited
- Type: Private
- Industry: Space
- Founded: 1 December 2017; 8 years ago
- Founders: Srinath Ravichandran; Moin SPM; Satyanaryan Chakravarthy; Janardhana Raju
- Headquarters: National Centre for Combustion Research and Development, IIT Madras, Chennai, Tamil Nadu, India
- Key people: Srinath Ravichandran (Co-founder and CEO); Moin SPM (Co-founder and COO)
- Products: Agnibaan SOrTeD; Agnibaan; Satellite propulsion systems
- Services: Launch service provider
- Number of employees: 150-200
- Website: www.agnikul.in

AgniKul Cosmos Private Limited (Note: pronounced: ɐɡnikul (ISO: Agnikula); According to the founders of the company, 'AgniKul' is the portmanteau of 'Agni' and 'Gurukula', and the name therefore translates to "a place where people learn to use fire") is an Indian private aerospace manufacturer and commercial launch service provider based in National Centre for Combustion Research and Development (NCCRD) of IIT Madras, Chennai. The start up aims to develop and launch its own small-lift launch vehicle such as the Agnibaan, capable of placing 100 kg (220 lb) payload into a 700 km (430 mi) orbit.

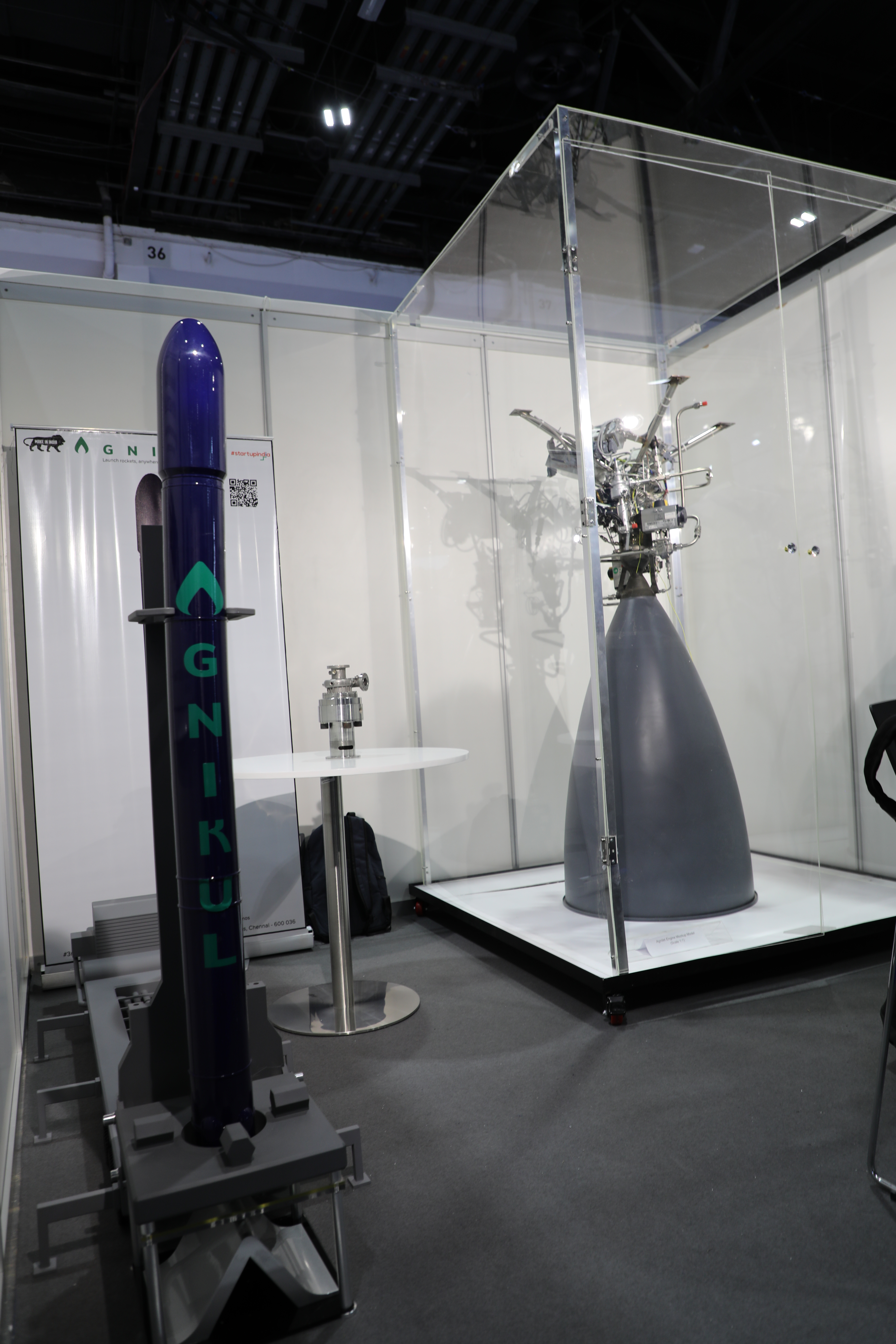
Mockups of the Agnibaan launch vehicle and its engine at the International Astronautical Congress 2021.

The first suborbital test vehicle was successfully launched on 30 May 2024. This mission achieved several notable milestones including world's first flight with a single-piece 3D-printed engine, India's first semi-cryo engine launch and India's first launch from a private launch pad.

== History ==
The company was founded by Srinath Ravichandran, Moin SPM, Satyanarayanan Chakravarthy and Janardhana Raju within IIT Madras with a seed funding of ₹3 crore (equivalent to ₹4.6 crore or US$480,000 in 2026) with aim to develop and launch its first rocket in 2021 and subsequently develop ability to provide launch service for satellites weighing up to 100 kg (220 lb). The start-up later managed to raise up to ₹23.4 crore (equivalent to ₹30 crore or US$3.1 million in 2026) from investors. Till end of 2020, the company had raised almost $4 million and headed towards ISRO for advisory. A Non-Disclosure Agreement (NDA) was signed with Department of Space (DoS) to obtain government's technological assistance in development of launch vehicles. Although the company entered an agreement with Alaska Aerospace Corporation to launch rocket from Kodiak Launch Complex as a commercial launch pad to test rockets was not available in India, the deal eventually fizzled out as no progress was made with the vehicle. AgniKul has received investment of an unspecified amount in a personal capacity from Anand Mahindra, chairman of Mahindra Group.

AgniKul signed a framework agreement with the Department of Space in September 2021 for access to ISRO facilities and technical expertise for the development of its two-stage small-satellite Agnibaan launch vehicle. On 7 November 2022, Agnikul Cosmos bought its first Flight Termination System (FTS) from ISRO. It will be used in Agnibaan scheduled for launch from Satish Dhawan Space Centre (SDSC).

In October 2023, AgniKul raised $26.7 million in a Series B funding round, bringing the total capital raised since its inception to $40 million. Both existing and new investors participated in the round. Recent funding rounds and reports from March 2026 place the company's valuation at over $500 million.

According to co-founder and CEO Srinath Ravichandran, Agnikul is attempting to perfect the technology of firing several engines simultaneously and conducting experiments for stage separation following the success of the Agnibaan SOrTeD mission. Additionally, the company began constructing rigs, which will take six to seven months. The first orbital launch will occur three months after rigs construction is complete.

They have inaugurated a Large Format Additive Metal Manufacturing (LFAMM) facility, which houses India's largest 3D metal printer dedicated to rocket components.

In February 2026, AgniKul Cosmos announced a partnership with Neevcloud to build a proof of concept model for a space-based AI data center, to be launched by Agnibaan. The project aims to utilize the cold environment and solar energy of space to solve Earth-bound cooling and power issues for AI processing, with a target launch as early as 2027. The company now claims they can 3D print an entire engine in just 7 days, reducing the traditional manufacturing timeline by nearly 97%.

The Government of Tamil Nadu, through its industrial arm TIDCO, invested ₹25 crore in AgniKul in early 2026. This is notable as it marks the first time a government body in India has taken an equity stake in a space startup.

On 25 September 2026, Technology Development Board (TDB) of the Department of Science and Technology, Government of India signed a agreement with AgniKul Cosmos under Research Development and Innovation (RDI) Fund for financial support of ₹200 crore (US$21 million). This support is for development of Agnibaan Reusable Launch Vehicle (RLV) from current TRL-4 to TRL-8. The RLV will have reusable architecture will have a lightweight upper stage, precise orbital insertion capabilities, semi-cryogenic liquid propulsion capable of deep throttling and restarting.

== Hardware ==
=== Launch vehicle ===
A graphical representation of the Agnibaan launch vehicle

Agnibaan (ISO: Agnibāṇa) (lit. 'Arrow of Fire') is envisaged to be a mobile launch system capable of placing a 100 kg (220 lb) satellite into a 700 km (430 mi) orbit. The rocket will be 18 meters long with a diameter of 1.3 meters and a lift-off mass of 14,000 kg (31,000 lb). It will use clustered engines on first stage in various configurations depending upon the payload and will only use liquid oxygen (LOX) and Kerosene based engines. A single-stage suborbital demonstrator, nicknamed Agnibaan SOrTeD (Suborbital Tech Demonstrator) was successfully launched on 30 May 2024 as a suborbital test flight. The mission also confirmed the use of Linux-based flight computers and an Ethernet-based architecture, a first for Indian rockets.

The Agnibaan launch vehicle distinguishes itself from conventional liquid-propellant rockets by utilizing an Electric Pump-fed cycle. This architecture employs high-discharge brushless DC motors to drive propellant pumps, effectively eliminating the need for complex pre-burners or gas generators. By replacing traditional turbomachinery with an electric system, AgniKul has significantly simplified the engine's internal plumbing, enabling a "plug-and-play" approach to engine clustering. The system is designed to run on a semi-cryogenic propellant combination of sub-cooled LOX and Aviation Turbine Fuel (ATF), which offers a balance of high performance and simplified handling compared to full cryogenic systems.

A primary technical advantage of this architecture is Software-Defined Throttling, where the speed of the electric motors can be adjusted near-instantaneously via flight algorithms. This provides a level of precision in thrust control that is traditionally difficult to achieve with gas-driven turbopumps. These electric pumps feed into single-piece 3D-printed engines made of Inconel, such as the Agnilet and the larger Agnite booster, which stands one metre tall. The integration of additive manufacturing and electric propulsion allows the company to produce a complete engine in as little as seven days, facilitating rapid, on-demand launch capabilities for the small-satellite market.

=== Rocket engine ===
In February 2021, AgniKul test fired its semi-cryogenic rocket engine Agnilet which will power second stage of its rocket Agnibaan for the first time. Agnikul claimed the engine has been developed in single-piece through 3D printing with no assembled parts. On 8 November 2022, Agnilet was successfully test fired for a few seconds on Vertical Test Facility, Thumba Equatorial Rocket Launching Station (TERLS), at Vikram Sarabhai Space Center (VSSC) to validate the design and manufacturing methodology used in the development process. AgniKul Cosmos holds the patent for design and manufacturing of single-piece rocket engine. The first dedicated factory to manufacture large number of 3D printed rocket engines is in IIT Madras Research Park.

On 7 February 2023, flight acceptance test of Angilet for AgniKul's controlled sub-orbital flight was successfully conducted. The engine was completely manufactured at Agnikul's Rocket Factory-1. In this particular test, engine was fired over and above the mission burn time as required for flight acceptance. On 25 February 2025, Agnikul fires a cluster stack of three Agnilet engines. Each of the Semi-cryogenic units were 3-D printed at Agnikul's Rocket Factory-1 in Chennai.

In March 2026, AgniKul successfully test-fired the Agnite booster engine, which is a one metre long single-piece 3D printed rocket engine of its kind. In February 2026, In a historic first for an Indian private space-tech company, AgniKul successfully test-fired a cluster of three semi-cryogenic engines simultaneously. This validated their proprietary software's ability to sync multiple electric-motor-driven pumps.

== Launch pad and mission control centre ==
AgniKul Cosmos inaugurated first private launch pad and mission control centre in India at the Satish Dhawan Space Centre in Sriharikota, Andhra Pradesh on 28 November 2022. The launchpad and the mission control centre are 4 km apart from one another. At present, the launchpad can handle liquid stage launch vehicle. All the critical systems performing functions at Agnikul launchpad (ALP) and the Agnikul mission control center (AMCC) have high degree of redundancy to ensure 100% operationality although none of these systems were tested so far. ISRO's range operations team will monitor key flight safety parameters during launches from ALP while AMCC can share critical data with ISRO's Mission Control Center. Both the facilities have support of ISRO and Indian National Space Promotion and Authorisation Centre (IN-SPACe).

== Industry collaboration ==
An agreement has been signed by Nibe Space, a division of Nibe Defence and Aerospace on 9 September 2024, with AgniKul Cosmos, Skyroot Aerospace, Centum Electronics, SpaceFields, Sisir Radar, CYRAN AI Solutions, and Larsen & Toubro for the launch of India's first constellation of multi-sensor, all-weather, high-revisit Earth observation satellites.

In July 2026, AgniKul Cosmos signed a memorandum of understanding (MoU) with Finnish space technology company ICEYE to jointly develop, launch, and operate synthetic aperture radar (SAR) Earth observation satellites from India. The collaboration aims to combine AgniKul's launch capabilities with ICEYE's SAR satellite technology for commercial Earth observation missions.

== See also ==
- Space industry of India
  - ISRO
  - IN–SPACe
  - Indian Space Association
- List of private spaceflight companies
  - Agnibaan
  - Skyroot Aerospace
  - Bellatrix Aerospace
