= Dhruva Space =

Indian aerospace company

Dhruva Space Private Limited
- Type: Private
- Industry: Aerospace
- Founded: 2012; 14 years ago
- Founder: Sanjay Srikanth Nekkanti
- Headquarters: Hyderabad, Telangana, India
- Key people: Sanjay Srikanth Nekkanti (CEO); Abhay Egoor (CTO); Krishna Teja Penamakuru (COO); Chaitanya Dora Surapureddy (CFO)
- Products: Small satellites; Ground stations; Satellite deployers
- Services: Aerospace Engineering; Mission Design and Planning
- Number of employees: approximately 130
- Website: www.dhruvaspace.com

Dhruva Space Private Limited is an Indian private aerospace manufacturer headquartered in Hyderabad, Telangana. Founded in 2012 by Sanjay Srikanth Nekkanti, the company is engaged in the development of small satellites in the commercial, governmental and academic markets. It provides the building, launching and operation of satellites.

The founding team were formerly working with Exseed Space (now called Satellize), ams AG, Cisco and KPMG and all of whom are alumni of institutes such as BITS Pilani, SRM Institute of Science and Technology, EMLYON Business School, Luleå University of Technology and Arizona State University.

The company's advisors include Lt Gen Anil Kumar Bhalla, former Director-General, Defence Intelligence Agency, former astronaut and former International Space Station Commander Chris Austin Hadfield OC OOnt MSC CD, and Niels Buus, former CEO of GomSpace.

== History ==
In 2014, Dhruva Space signed a deal with AMSAT India to develop HAMSAT-II.

In December 2019, Dhruva Space raised ₹5 crore in funding led by Mumbai Angels Network.

In September 2020, Dhruva Space became the first Indian private company to secure an order for end-to-end design and development of Space-grade solar arrays for satellites.

In October 2021, Dhruva Space raised ₹22 crore in funding led by Indian Angel Network (IAN) Fund and Blue Ashva Capital.

On 16 March 2022, Dhruva Space signed a commercial launch services agreement (LSA) with NewSpace India Limited for an in-orbit test of its Dhruva Space Orbit Deployers. These are likely to be used on board the PSLV and the SSLV.

On 10 June 2022 at the inauguration of Indian National Space Promotion and Authorization Centre (IN-SPACe) in Ahmedabad, Gujarat, Dhruva Space signed an MoU with IN-SPACe.

On 24 June, Dhruva Space and Digantara Aerospace were announced as the first two private companies to receive authorisation from IN-SPACe for space activities.

On 15 July 2024, Dhruva Space was granted authorisation by IN-SPACe to provide Ground Stations as a Service (GSaaS). GSaaS will ensure reliable data transmission, enhance mission flexibility, and reduce operational costs pertaining to Ground Stations.

=== Capability and Infrastructure ===
Dhruva Space currently operates out of a 22,000 square-foot facility in the Begumpet area of Hyderabad. The workspace houses specialised facilities such as two Class 10,000 Cleanrooms, a Helmholtz Cage, mechanical and avionics labs, and an operational ground station and mission control centre.

On 14 October 2023, Dhruva Space shared a first look at the company's upcoming 280,000 square-foot facility to be situated in the outskirts of Hyderabad that will design, engineer, assemble, integrate and test large-scale spacecraft weighing up to 500 kilograms. These spacecraft include satellite platforms and subsystems, satellite orbital deployers, ground station antennas, and more. The facility completion will be done in a multi-phase manner over multiple years; and the first phase – to be ready by mid-2025 will be 120,000 square feet, which includes a 30,000 square foot Spacecraft Solar Array Assembly Line.

=== Partnerships ===
On 16 February 2023, Dhruva Space signed a Memorandum of Agreement with French strategic equipment supplier Comat, for a bilateral technology exchange.

On 16 March 2023, Dhruva Space announced a partnership with France-based satellite operator and global IoT connectivity provider Kinéis. Both companies will collaborate to establish space and ground infrastructure. Kinéis' and Dhruva Space's partnership will culminate in a joint satellite mission for various IoT applications. This mission was announced by French space agency CNES in a press release detailing Prime Minister of India Narendra Modi's official tour of France in July 2023.

=== AstraView Commercial Satellite Imagery ===
On 2 December 2024, Dhruva Space launched AstraView, the company's commercial satellite imagery service.

=== Awards ===
In March 2022, Dhruva Space was named 'Best Spacetech Startup' by Entrepreneur India magazine, BusinessEx.com and Gupshup for the Startup 2022 Awards. The company was given the same award again in September 2024.

On March 17, 2022, Dhruva Space won the Qualcomm Design for India Challenge 2021 for their Bolt module. In October 2022, the company exhibited Bolt at the India Mobile Congress 2022 at Pragati Maidan, New Delhi, as part of Qualcomm India's 5G Startups Showcase.

On 1 March 2023, Dhruva Space was awarded with an Innovation for India Award by the Marico Innovation Foundation. The Innovation for India Awards was held at Jio World Centre, Mumbai, and the award was accoladed to Dhruva Space by Rajeev Bakshi, Non-Executive & Independent Director, Marico Limited.

On 27 October, Dhruva Space was listed as one of Forbes India's DGEMS 200 for the year 2023. Forbes India partnered for this launch edition of DGEMS with D Globalist, a global business mobility accelerator.

== Missions ==
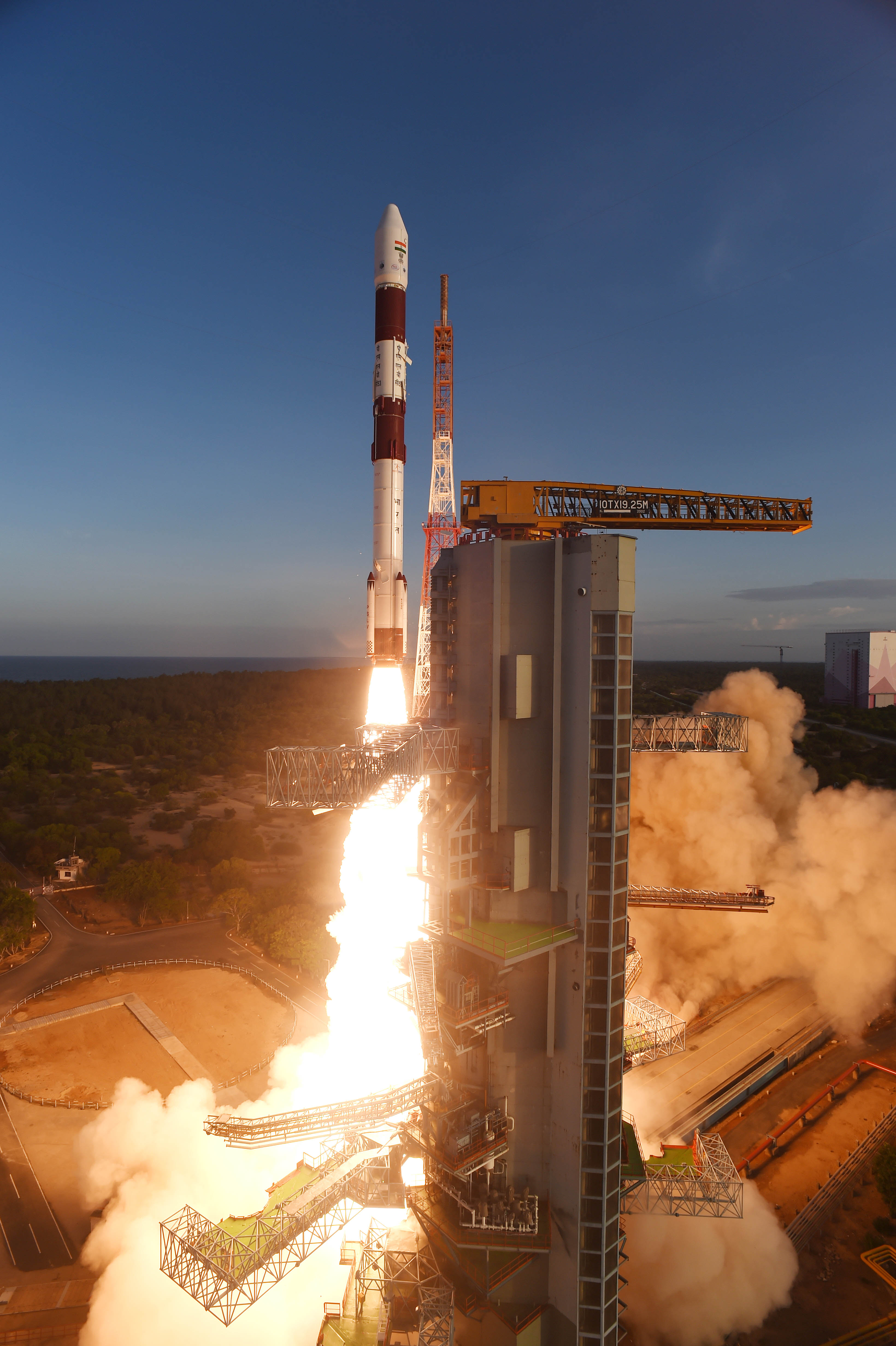
ISRO's PSLV-C53 launch on 30 June 2022, which carried Dhruva Space's 1U Satellite Orbital Deployer

On 30 June 2022, Dhruva Space's Satellite Orbital Deployer was successfully tested and space-qualified (known as DSOD-1U Mission) in Indian Space Research Organisation's PSLV C53 mission, hosted on POEM. The launch took place at 18:02 IST from the Satish Dhawan Space Centre (SDSC) at Sriharikota, Andhra Pradesh.

On 26 November 2022, Dhruva Space launched two amateur radio communication CubeSats as part of ISRO's PSLV C54 mission. The launch of Dhruva Space's Thybolt Mission took place at 11:56am from the Satish Dhawan Space Centre (SDSC) at Sriharikota, Andhra Pradesh. As of 1 February 2023, Thybolt-1 and Thybolt-2 completed 1000 orbits in LEO. The mission lifetime, according to the company, is approximately one year. At Broadband India Forum’s India SatCom 2022 in New Delhi, India, Dhruva Space was accoladed by IN-SPACe Chairman Dr. Pawan K Goenka to have 'the first private Indian satellites authorised by IN-SPACe, successfully deployed in orbit.' In June 2024, Dhruva Space announced that the Thybolt-1 and Thybolt-2 satellites had deorbited after more than 15,000 combined orbits.

The mission observed support from dignitaries including Prime Minister of India Narendra Modi, Minister for Road Transport & Highways Nitin Gadkari, Minister of Tourism, Culture and Development of North Eastern Region of India G Kishan Reddy, and Minister for Municipal Administration & Urban Development, Industries & Commerce, and IT Kalvakuntla Taraka Rama Rao.

On 22 April 2023, the company launched its 3U and 6U Satellite Orbital Deployers and its Dhruva Space Satellite Orbiter Link (DSOL) onboard ISRO’s PSLV C55, as part of POEM-2. Dhruva Space and IN-SPACe have both declared the missions successful.

=== Launching Expeditions for Aspiring Payloads (LEAP) ===
Dhruva Space Space-qualified its P-30 nanosatellite platform launched as ‘LEAP - Technology Demonstrator’ (or LEAP-TD) payload onboard ISRO’s PSLV-C58 POEM-3 mission on 1 January 2024. This mission not only validated the company's P-30 platform but also its various subsystems in-orbit.

The company's next mission is LEAP-1 mission which will see Dhruva Space's P-30 nanosatellite set to validate the satellite imagery payload of an Australian customer. The mission was originally set to fly onboard PSLV-C59, but it was later delayed and finally reach orbit in August 2025 as a rideshare payload on a Falcon 9 Block 5 launch.

In September 2024, Dhruva Space onboarded Mumbai-based Manastu Space as a customer for its LEAP-3 mission, wherein Manastu Space aims to Space-qualify their advanced green propulsion system that uses a hydrogen peroxide-based fuel with proprietary additives, combined with an ultra-high-temperature catalyst and a novel combustion chamber.
