= Bellatrix Aerospace =

Indian aerospace company

- Type: Private
- Industry: Space
- Founded: 2015; 11 years ago
- Founder: Rohan M Ganapathy; Yashas Karanam
- Headquarters: Bengaluru, Karnataka, India
- Key people: Rohan M Ganapathy; Yashas Karanam
- Products: Arka HET; Rudra Green Propulsion System; Pushpak OTV
- Services: Electric propulsion systems; Chemical propulsion rocket engines
- Website: bellatrix.aero

Bellatrix Aerospace is a private Indian aerospace manufacturer and small satellite manufacturing company, headquartered in Bengaluru, Karnataka. The company was established in 2015 and in June 2022, the company raised $8 million in a Series A funding round to pursue the development of in-space propulsion systems.

== History ==
The name Bellatrix is from the Latin bellātrix which means "female warrior". It was also used in naming the red supergiant star Bellatrix.

Bellatrix Aerospace had initially proposed the development of its small-lift orbital class launch vehicle named Chetak and had planned for its launch in 2023. The two-stage Chetak was to be powered by a number of its proposed Aeon engines which would use liquid methane as propellant. Later in 2019, water was proposed as a propellant for an electric propulsion system. On 8 February 2021, Bellatrix Aerospace announced its partnership with Skyroot Aerospace. However, on 9 February 2022, Founder Rohan Ganapathy announced on Twitter that the company had stopped working on its rocket and instead focusing exclusively on propulsion systems.

On 9 October 2024, Bellatrix Aerospace and NewSpace India Limited signed a contract for the integration of Pushpak Orbital Transfer Vehicle (OTV) for NSIL's launch missions. With the ability to move satellites into other orbits with more accuracy and efficiency, Pushpak OTV is made for in-orbit maneuvering. According to Bellatrix Aerospace, launching a satellite on a specialized launch vehicle for micro and nano satellites costs about $45,000/kg; if launched on a Pushpak, the cost drops to $25,000/kg for low earth orbit. Additionally, it can facilitate future deep space missions, inclination changes, GEO transfer missions, and multi-orbit deployment sequences. Pushpak OTV to assist small satellites and CubeSats to reach their designated orbits. The first launch with Pushpak OTV integrated into an ISRO rocket is expected to be in early 2026, with the company saying that it has already on-boarded two customers, with talks ongoing with others.

== Product development ==
=== ARKA series ===
Hall-effect thrusters developed by the company for micro-satellites weighing 50-500 kg. All the ground tests were completed by 2021. Successfully completed tests in space on POEM-3.

=== RUDRA series ===
It is the first high-performance green propulsion (HPGP) system in India that can replace hydrazine-based satellite propulsion systems. Saagar Malaichamy, co-founder and senior scientist at Bellatrix Aerospace's Mono-propellant Systems Division, collaborated with Professor Charlie Oommen from the Indian Institute of Science's (IISc) Department of Aerospace Engineering to develop the green mono-propellant. A 1N thruster that can be used in micro and small spacecraft weighing between 50 and 1,000 kg is now undergoing ground testing. The successful space test of RUDRA 0.3 HPGP on POEM-3 took place on 27 January 2024. On 2 January 2025, an upgraded RUDRA 0.3 HPGP was successfully tested in space on the POEM-4.

=== Harbringer ===
Launched aboard the SpaceX Transporter-16 mission, the Harbinger platform is to serve as a technology demonstration satellite to validate the prototype in-orbit control systems and propulsion technologies developed by Bellatrix aerospace. It had been commissioned by early-April 2026 and orbits the earth at a 510 km low-earth orbit, inclined at 14 degrees.

=== Project 200 ===
Project 200 by Bellatrix Aerospace aims to build an Ultra-Low Orbit satellite that will orbit at a height of less than 200 kilometers. By 2026, it hopes to launch its first satellite. Comparatively greater resolution imagery is possible with ultra-LEO satellites for Earth observation uses like mapping, agriculture, and climate modeling. Additionally, communication latency with ground stations is decreased by low orbits. Significant air drag also affects satellites at very low earth orbit. Hence, the orbits are "self-cleaning," meaning space trash is less of an issue because satellites quickly fall back to Earth at the end of their lives. In order to combat air drag, the spacecraft must carry a lot of propellant to power its engines, which might make it heavier and bulkier and significantly reduce its operating time. By creating a unique air-intake electric propulsion system that gathers air particles from the upper atmosphere and uses them as propellant, Bellatrix overcame this difficulty. After successful ground testing, the startup showcased the technology at Bengaluru Space Expo 2024.

The platform that the company is developing will be around two meters long and have a payload capacity of fifty to seventy kg. It is intended to operate between 180 and 200 kilometers and will generate more than 1 kilowatt of power from a solar panel array. The firm has developed a hybrid engine that ionizes the gas using radio waves and then accelerates it using a Hall-effect thruster. In order to balance the combination of passive and active compression, the startup had to carefully tune the satellite's size, shape, and intake. Although the engine has been proven, Bellatrix plans to demonstrate the satellite on a large scale in 2026.

== See also ==
- Space industry of India
  - ISRO
  - NewSpace India Limited
  - IN–SPACe
  - Indian Space Association
- List of private spaceflight companies
  - AgniKul Cosmos
  - Skyroot Aerospace
