= Cosmonautics of Ukraine =

Cosmonautics of Ukraine is the aggregate infrastructure and activities of Ukraine in the field of providing space services, as well as in the space industry.

== Main achievements ==
Ukrainian designers, scientists and researchers have made a significant contribution to the development of world space science. Ukrainian scientists have developed ideas for interplanetary flights and worked out theories of rocket technology. Domestic enterprises have occupied and continue to occupy leading positions in world cosmonautics. The leading role in this is played by the Pivdenne Machine-Building Plant and Pivdenne Design Bureau in the Dnipro.

== Rocket and space industry ==
The Ukrainian rocket and space industry includes almost 40 large enterprises and many small and medium-sized development enterprises and independent research laboratories. The leading center among them is the Pivdenne Design Bureau and the Pivdenne Machine-Building Plant production association in the city of Dnipro, where more than 400 artificial Earth satellites have been designed and create mass-produce launch vehicles, spacecraft, control, orientation, and trajectory measurement systems.

The achievements of domestic specialists were the creation of the spacecraft "Sich-1", "Okean-O", "AUOS" and "Micron", the launch vehicles "Zenit-3SL", "Dnipro", "Tsyklon-3". Ukraine is also known for the docking equipment "Kurs" for the International Space Station, missile aiming systems, control system equipment for the space complexes "Soyuz", "Progress", "Proton", unique objects of ground infrastructure: control and correction stations for global navigation satellite systems, a network of observations of geophysical phenomena.
