= Pixxel =

Indian aerospace company

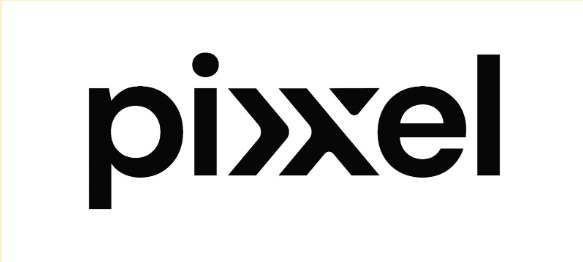

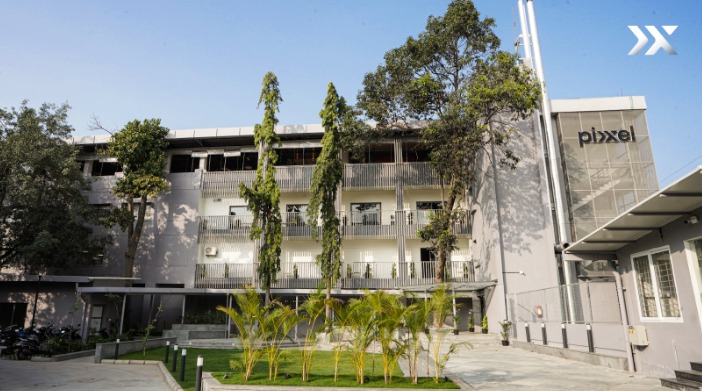
- Spacecraft Manufacturing Facility in Bengaluru, India
- Type: Private
- Industry: Space
- Founded: February 2019; 7 years ago
- Founders: Awais Ahmed; Kshitij Khandelwal
- Headquarters: Bengaluru, India; El Segundo, CA
- Key people: Awais Ahmed (CEO); Kshitij Khandelwal (CTO)
- Products: Hyperspectral Imaging Satellites; Earth Observation data platform; Satellite Manufacturing and Missions
- Services: Satellites
- Website: pixxel.space

Pixxel (pik·sl) is a Indian private space technology company building a constellation of hyperspectral imaging satellites into a sun-synchronous orbit.

== History ==
Pixxel was founded by Awais Ahmed and Kshitij Khandelwal in 2019 while studying at BITS Pilani. In 2023, the company was named one of TIME's 100 best Inventions in the Sustainability category and a Technology Pioneer by the World Economic Forum in 2024. It was Asia's only space startup to qualify for the 2019 Techstars Starburst Space Accelerator in Los Angeles. Pixxel's mission is to build a health monitor for the planet.

Pixxel's hyperspectral satellites are designed to detect, monitor, and predict threats invisible to satellites in orbit today. This is made possible by the hyperspectral cameras' ability to capture additional wavelengths of light across a broad and continuous range on the electromagnetic spectrum beyond those typically observed by conventional satellite imaging systems. This technology provides detailed information about the health and composition of the Earth's surface, supporting decision-making in agriculture, energy, mining, infrastructure, environment and more.

Pixxel is also building Aurora, its Earth Observation platform, which intends to make remote sensing accessible by simplifying the visualization and analysis of remote sensing datasets.

Pixxel has launched and operated three demonstration hyperspectral satellites with 10-30 meter spatial resolutions. The company plans to launch six commercial 5m resolution hyperspectral Earth observation small satellites, named Fireflies, in 2025 and eighteen more by 2026. Pixxel partnered with Dragonfly Aerospace to develop the hyperspectral payloads.

While pursuing his undergraduate degree, Awais Ahmed was one of the founding members and engineering lead at team Hyperloop India, a national finalist at the SpaceX Hyperloop Pod Competition in 2017. This team was the only one from India to win and was invited to SpaceX HQ to build, demonstrate, and race their Hyperloop vehicle. This experience inspired Ahmed to focus on space innovation.

Identifying a gap in spectral resolution and the need for more detailed satellite imagery available in the market, Ahmed and Kshitij Khandelwal co-founded Pixxel in 2019 to provide high-resolution hyperspectral data and address climate change and concerns across agriculture, mining, environment, energy and more.

Pixxel launched its first satellite, Shakuntala/TD-2, on a SpaceX Falcon-9 rideshare mission, Transporter-4, on April 1, 2022. Pixxel's third satellite, Anand, was scheduled to be launched in late 2020 on a Soyuz rocket. It later entered into an agreement with India's state-owned NSIL to use a PSLV rocket to launch it in early 2021. Its launch on board the PSLV-C51 was then delayed in February 2021 due to technical issues. Anand was launched on ISRO's PSLV-C54 successfully on 26 November 2022.

Pixxel has three demo satellites they launched between 2021 and 2022. One of them, Shakuntala, has reached its end of life after monitoring the Earth for ~620 days and beaming down its first hyperspectral images for commercial use. The six satellites, referred to as the Fireflies, are being built and will be launched with ISRO and SpaceX in 2024. The next set of satellites will be called Honeybees.

Pixxel also launched a first-of-its-kind 30,000+ sq ft. Spacecraft Assembly, Integration, and Testing (AIT) facility called 'MegaPixxel' in Bengaluru, India, to design, manufacture, integrate and test their satellites under one roof.

== Funding and investment ==
Pixxel's seed round of funding in August 2020 raised US$8 million from Lightspeed India Partners, Blume Ventures, GrowX Ventures, Techstars, Omnivore VC, and others.

This was followed by a US$27 million Series A funding in March 2022 from Radical Ventures, Seraphim Space Investment, Sparta LLC, and other existing investors, as well as an undisclosed amount from Accenture in 2022. Their US$27 million was the largest amount raised by an Indian space company at the time. It was also the first time an international venture capital fund invested in the Indian space ecosystem. The company announced a Series B extension funding of US$24 million from M&G Catalyst and Glade Brook Capital Partners, bringing the total Series B funding to US$60 Million. This funding puts Pixxel as one of the highest-funded space-tech startups in India and the highest-funded hyperspectral imaging company globally. Since its inception, Pixxel has raised a total of US$95 million in funding. In September 2026, Pixxel raised $100 million in a Series C funding round co-led by Temasek and Seraphim Capital. The funding brought its total funding to $195 million.

== Technology and products ==
Pixxel Space's technology includes its constellation of hyperspectral imaging satellites and its in-house Earth observation platform, Aurora. In addition to its imaging capabilities, Pixxel makes satellites.

=== Hyperspectral imaging satellites ===
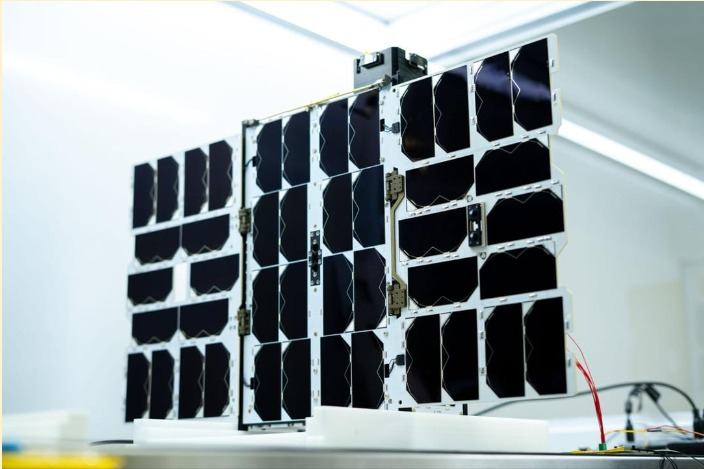
Hyperspectral Imaging Satellites

Pixxel is building a constellation of hyperspectral imaging satellites that provide 5-metre resolution and capture up to 50 times more data than conventional satellites across over 250 VNIR and SWIR bands.

Pixxel's hyperspectral imaging sensors capture and analyze images across a wide range of the electromagnetic spectrum, including wavelengths invisible to the naked eye and beyond the capabilities of current multispectral imaging sensors. Traditional multispectral imaging satellites capture only a few broad and discrete bands, while Pixxel's technology offers a detailed and unique 'spectral fingerprint' (or spectral signature) of Earth's objects, materials, and conditions, enabling precise identification and monitoring.

The satellites feature a 40 km swath width and a 24-hour revisit frequency. Pixxel's technology has applications across agriculture, environment, mining, energy, urban planning and other industries for enhanced crop management, environmental monitoring and sustainability, improving surveying, monitoring pipeline leaks and infrastructure safety, responsible resource exploration, disaster assessment and more.

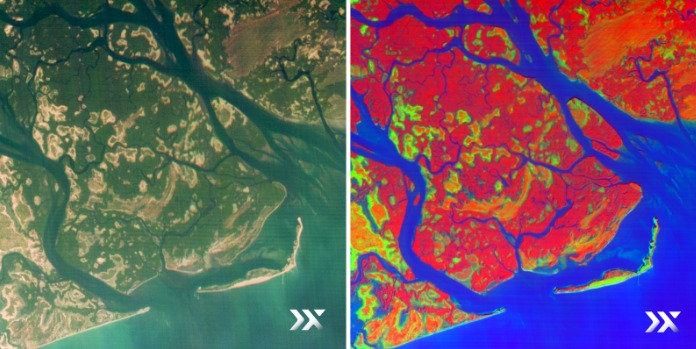
A hyperspectral image of Senegal's Saloum Delta from Pixxel. The hyperspectral image (right) shows more detail than the regular image (left). The different colours show different crop species.

=== Earth observation studio ===
Aurora is Pixxel's Earth observation studio. Hyperspectral data from Pixxel's satellites are expected to be available starting in 2025.

=== Satellite manufacturing and missions ===
Pixxel offers satellite manufacturing services.

== Partnerships, collaborations, and grants ==
Pixxel has 50+ customers across industries, 90+ resellers across major geographies, and multiple MoU collaborations and grants. Some of Pixxel's partnerships include Rio Tinto, Data Farming, European Space Imaging (EUSI), Sanborn, SkyFi, Procalculo, and more, as well as MoUs with the Save Soil Foundation and the Mahalanobis National Crop Forecast Centre (MNCFC DAC).

In order to provide hyperspectral satellite data in South Korea, Pixxel and Satrec Initiative subsidiary SI Imaging Services signed a memorandum of understanding on January 8, 2025.

=== NRO ===
The company has been awarded a 5-year contract by the NRO Commercial Systems Program Office (CSPO) under the Strategic Commercial Enhancements Broad Agency Announcement for Commercial Hyperspectral Capabilities. They will provide technical hyperspectral imagery remote sensing capabilities via modelling simulation and data evaluation.

=== NASA ===
In September 2024, NASA announced Pixxel's selection as part of NASA's $476 million Commercial SmallSat Data Acquisition Program On-Ramp1 Multiple Award contract. Under this contract, Pixxel will provide NASA and its U.S. government and academic partners with hyperspectral Earth observation data to support the administration's Earth science research and application activities. This contract period of performance runs through November 2028.

== Awards and recognition ==
Pixxel has been named:

- WEF Tech Pioneers: 2024
- Via Satellite Top 10 hottest satellite companies in 2023: February 2023
- Fast Company Top Ten Innovative Space Companies of 2023: March 2023

Awais Ahmed and Kshitij Khandelwal made the Forbes 30 Under 30 in April 2021 and in Hurun India's Future Unicorn Index 2024 list in June 2024. Additionally, Awais was named to the MIT Innovators Under 35 list in 2023 and the Fortune 40 Under 40 list in 2022.

== Launch history and plans ==
S No	Satellites	Launch date	Launch vehicle	Launch site	Orbit	Status	Citation
1	Pixxel-TD 2 (Shakuntala)	1 April 2022	Falcon 9 Block 5	Cape Canaveral, SLC-40	SSO-LEO	Success	
2	Pixxel-TD 1 (Anand)	26 November 2022	PSLV-XL	Satish Dhawan, FLP	SSO	Success	
3	Firefly 1,2,3	14 January 2025	Falcon 9 Block 5	Vandenberg, SLC-4E	SSO	Success	
4	Firefly 4,5,6	26 August 2025	Falcon 9 Block 5	Vandenberg, SLC-4E	SSO	Success	

== See also ==
- Indian Space Research Organisation
- List of private spaceflight companies
- Skyroot Aerospace
- Satellize
- New Space India Limited
- Bellatrix Aerospace
