= Satyanarayanan Chakravarthy =

Indian academic

- Citizenship: India
- Education: B.Tech. (Aero), IIT Madras; M.S. (Aero), Georgia Institute of Technology; Ph.D., Georgia Institute of Technology
- Occupations: Technical Lead and Founder of The ePlane Company; Professor of Aerospace Engineering at IIT Madras
- Known for: The ePlane Company, AgniKul Cosmos, National Centre for Combustion Research & Development, GalaxEye

Satyanarayanan Chakravarthy (also known as Prof. Satya) is an Indian academic and professor of aerospace engineering at the Indian Institute of Technology Madras. He is the founder of The ePlane Company, an electric aviation company focused on urban air mobility, and co-founder of AgniKul Cosmos, an aerospace manufacturer and commercial launch service provider based at IIT Madras.

Chakravarthy heads the National Centre for Combustion Research & Development (NCCRD).

He is also the co-founder and chief scientist of TuTr Hyperloop, a deep-tech and hyperloop technology company.

== Education ==
Chakravarthy completed a Bachelor of Technology in Aerospace engineering from IIT Madras in 1991. He subsequently pursued graduate studies at the Georgia Institute of Technology, United States, earning a Master of Science in Aerospace engineering in 1992 and a Doctor of Philosophy in 1995, with research focused on aerospace engineering, combustion, and propulsion systems.

== Aerospace career ==
Following a postdoctoral period at Georgia Tech until approximately 1997, Chakravarthy joined IIT Madras as a faculty member in the Department of Aerospace engineering. He has also held visiting faculty positions at Georgia Institute of Technology in the years 2000 & 2001 and at the Technische Universität Darmstadt, Darmstadt, Germany in the years 2002, 2003, 2006, & 2009.

In February 2017, Chakravarthy co-founded AgniKul Cosmos along with other co-founders Srinath Ravichandran, Moin SPM and Janardhana Raju. a space launch vehicle startup.

He also heads GalaxEye, a satellite technology company which was founded by Suyash Singh and Denil Chawda in May 2021.

Since February 2022, Chakravarthy has been serving as a co-founder and part-time advisor to TuTr Hyperloop, a deep tech & hyperloop technology company. The company aims to develop an ultra high-speed ground transportation system.

In 2019, he founded The ePlane Company, a subsidiary of "Ubifly Technologies Private Limited", which is incubated at IIT Madras. The company develops passenger, relief & cargo eVTOL aircraft for urban mobility applications.

In 2023, the Directorate General of Civil Aviation (DGCA) granted the company Design Organisation Approval for an electric aircraft and their type certification application for their e200X aircraft was also accepted by DGCA in 2024.

== Research and publications ==
Chakravarthy has published 188 publications cited by 3,229 citations. His h-index is more than 188.

- Vortex-Resonant Sound Interaction in a Duct Containing an Orifice, 4 November 2004, Vol: 56, Citation:2, Botcha Karthik, N. Venkateswarlu, B.V.R. Kowsik, Satyanarayanan R Chakravarthy
- Acoustic Field in a Duct Resulting from Vortex Shedding from Multiple Restrictors, 4 November 2005, Vol-57, Citation: 1, B. Karthik, B.V.R. Kowsik, N. Venkateswarlu, R.I. Sujith, S.R. Chakravarthy]
- Analysis of Transition to Thermo-Acoustic Instability in Swirl Combustor Using Variational Auto-Encoders, Citation: 6, 4 August 2022, Vikram Ramanan, Anusai Ramankutty, Sharan Sreedeep, S R Chakravarthy

== Awards and honours ==
- Young Engineer Award, Indian National Academy of Engineering (2003)
