= Shree Jain Vidyalaya =

- SJV

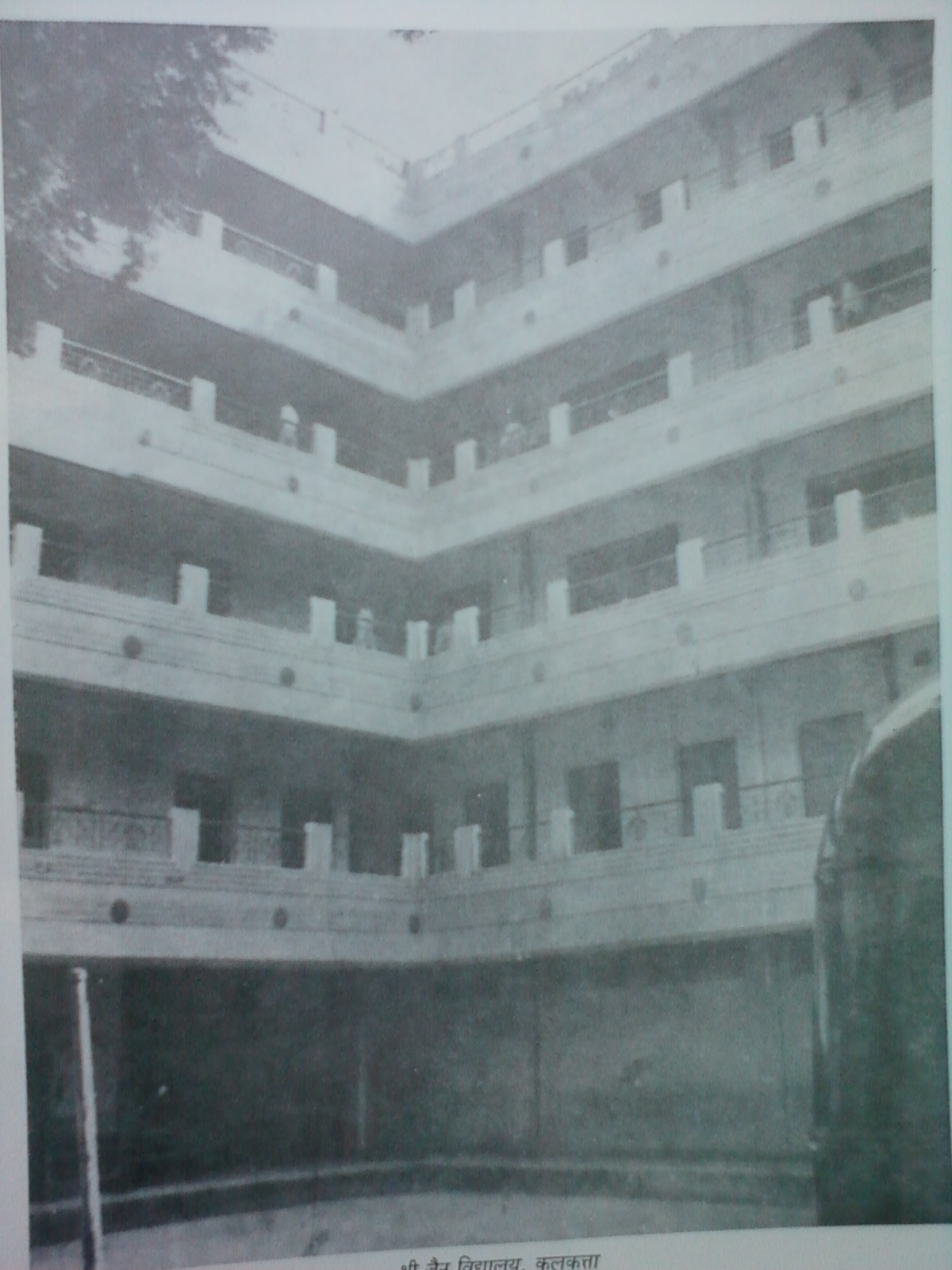
- SJV during its early years

Location
- 18D, Phusraj Bacchawat Path; Kolkata, West Bengal, 700001; India
- Coordinates: 22.576°N 88.351°E

Information
- School type: Private, Single-sex
- Motto: सम्यक ज्ञान, सम्यक दर्शन, सम्यक चरित्र (Right Knowledge, Right Belief, Right Conduct)
- Patron saint: Mahavir
- Established: 17 March 1934
- Founder: Phusraj Bacchwat
- Status: Open
- Sister school: Shree Jain Vidyalaya, Howrah (Boys)
- Area trustee: Shree Shwetambar Sthanakvasi Jain Sabha
- President: Binod Chand Kankaria
- Headmaster: Sanjay Kumar Pandey
- Teaching staff: 120+
- Grades: 1-12
- Enrollment: 2900+
- Language: English
- Campus type: Urban
- Accreditation: WBBSE, WBCHSE
- Newspaper: Abhas (Hindi : आभास)
- Yearbook: Abha (Hindi: आभा)
- Website: sjv.edu.in

Shree Jain Vidyalaya, Kolkata (abbr. SJV) is a school for secondary and senior secondary education located in the Burrabazar region of Kolkata, India. It is affiliated with the State Boards WBBSE and WBCHSE and with an enrollment of over 2,900 students. The school was founded in 1934 by Phushraj Bacchwat, in whose honour the address of the school was renamed from Sukeas Lane to Phusraj Bachhawat Path.

Sanjay Kumar Pandey, who was a former teacher and student of Shree Jain Vidyalaya, is the current headmaster. The school also operates as an IGNOU study center, offering services for BA, BCOM, BPP, CIT, CES, CDS, DCE, and other courses.

== Notable alumni ==
- Pawan Kumar Goenka, head of Mahindra's Automotive Division, awarded Padma Shri in 2025
