= Agnibaan =

Indian small-lift orbital class launch vehicle developed by AgniKul Cosmos

- Function: Small-lift launch vehicle
- Manufacturer: AgniKul Cosmos
- Country of origin: India

Size
- Height: 18 m (59 ft)
- Diameter: 1.3 m (4 ft 3 in)
- Mass: 14,000 kg (31,000 lb)
- Stages: 2-3

Payload to LEO
- Altitude: 700 km (430 mi)
- Orbital inclination: 45.0°
- Mass: 500 kg (1,100 lb)

Associated rockets
- Comparable: Alpha; Electron; Pegasus; SSLV

Launch history
- Status: Under development

First stage
- Engines: 4/5/6/7 × Agnilet (Customizable)
- Thrust: 140 kN (sea level)
- Burn time: 285 sec
- Propellant: LOX/ RP-1

Second stage
- Engines: 1 × Agnilet
- Thrust: 25 kN (sea level)
- Burn time: 355 sec
- Propellant: LOX/ RP-1

Third stage
- Engines: 1 × Agnilet
- Propellant: LOX/ RP-1

Agnibaan (Sanskrit, ISO: Agni 'Fire', Bāṇa 'Arrow', lit. 'Arrow of Fire') is a three-stage small-lift launch vehicle of AgniKul Cosmos, currently under development. It is capable of placing a 100 kg (220 lb) satellite into a 700 km (430 mi) orbit. The rocket will be 18 meters long with a diameter of 1.3 meters and a lift-off mass of 14,000 kg (31,000 lb). The first stage is powered by seven Agnilet engines. The second stage is powered by the same Agnilet engine which will have a larger nozzle than the sea level nozzle to optimize it for vacuum.

== Design ==
=== Engines ===
Agnibaan will use clustered engines in various configurations in the first stage, depending on the payload. It will also use a vacuum optimized version of the Agnilet in the second stage. These engines use liquid oxygen and kerosene as the oxidizer and fuel. The first stage of the Agnibaan is powered by 4-7 Agnilet engines, depending on the mission requirement, each with a thrust of 25 kN (yet to be tested) at sea level.

These are all electric-pump-fed engines allowing for simplified engine design and highly configurable engine clustering architectures. It is capable of operating with a specific impulse of 285 seconds at sea level. The entire combustion section is a single-piece assembly and is fully 3D printed. The second stage of the vehicle also uses an Agnilet engine optimized for vacuum use. It is thought to deliver up to 355 seconds of specific impulse in vacuum environment. An optional third stage sits inside the payload fairing.

== Launch site ==
Agnibaan is intended to be built with the capability to launch from multiple launch ports across the world. The launch pad "Dhanush" (Sanskrit, ISO: Dhanuṣa, lit. 'Bow'), the first private launch pad and mission control center in India at the Satish Dhawan Space Centre (SDSC) in Sriharikota, Andhra Pradesh, was inaugurated on 28 November 2022 and is designed to support all configurations of Agnibaan with reusability in mind. Dimensions of Dhanush are designed with road dimensions and global transportability restrictions in mind.

The launchpad and the mission control center are 4 km (2.5 mi) apart from one another. The launchpad currently has the capability to accommodate liquid stage launch vehicles. The pad has received the name Dhanush and referred as ALP-01. All the critical systems performing functions at Agnikul launchpad (ALP) and the Agnikul mission control center (AMCC) have high degree of redundancy to ensure 100% operationality, although none of these systems have been tested so far. ISRO's range operations team will monitor key flight safety parameters during launches from ALP while AMCC can share critical data with ISRO's Mission Control Center. Both the facilities have support of ISRO and Indian National Space Promotion and Authorisation Centre (IN-SPACe).

== Schedule ==
The company previously aimed to develop and launch its first rocket in 2021. A non-disclosure agreement (NDA) was signed with the Department of Space to obtain the government's technological assistance in the development of launch vehicles on 3 December 2020. However, the company entered into an agreement with Alaska Aerospace Corporation to launch a rocket from Kodiak Launch Complex as a commercial launch pad to test the rocket as the launch pad was not available for use in India. "We are planning to test launch our rocket Agnibaan before 2022 end. Our plan is to launch the rocket from a mobile launch pad. The test launch will happen from India's spaceport Sriharikota belonging to ISRO", said Srinath Ravichandran, co-founder and CEO of AgniKul Cosmos. No orbital rocket was launched from 2022-2025. Agnibaan SOrTeD, a single stage suborbital technical demonstration rocket was launched on 30 May 2024.

== Launch history ==
=== Agnibaan SOrTeD ===
A test flight of single-stage version of the rocket, Agnibaan SOrTeD, successfully flew on a suborbital mission on 30 May 2024 from SDSC, after being postponed several times due to many issues.

S.No	Date / time (UTC)	Rocket, Configuration	Launch site	Payload	Orbit	Customer	Status	Note
1.	30 May 2024 / 07:15	Agnibaan SOrTeD	SDSC ALP	(India) Mass simulator	Suborbital	—N/a	Success	Seven seconds after lift-off, auto-pilot was engaged. The rocket began traveling across the ocean, executed the pitch-over maneuver, and then carried out its intended course. The rocket entered wind biasing maneuver at roughly 60 seconds. The rocket then carried on flying until it burned out and fell back into Bay of Bengal.

=== Agnibaan ===
S.No	Date / time (UTC)	Rocket, Configuration	Launch site	Payload	Orbit	Customer	Status	Note
1.	TBA	Agnibaan	SDSC ALP	(India)	Low Earth	TBA	Planned	Maiden flight of Agnibaan rocket.
2.	TBA	Agnibaan	SDSC ALP	(India)	Low Earth	TBA	Planned	Recovery of Agnibaan rocket after flight and landing.

== See also ==
- ISRO
- Skyroot Aerospace
- Small-lift launch vehicle

=== Rockets of similar class ===
- Alpha
- Electron
- Falcon 1
- SSLV
- Vega
- Vikram-1
