= Space Activities Bill =

Proposed space legislation in India

India's Space Activities Bill will provide for a dedicated outer space legislation for India. The draft was first made public for comments by the Department of Space in November 2017. The bill covers various factors of India's space goals, including international and national obligations, defines offences and subsequent punishments, barriers of entry for private companies, liability for damages caused in space etc. On 5 July 2020, Secretary, Department of Space and chairman, ISRO K Sivan said that the Space Activities Bill is in its final stages. Accordingly, the Bill will be placed in both house of Parliament. After due parliamentary procedure, the Space Activities Act will pave the way for the formation of space rules. For private companies to start space launches in India, the Act is needed to be in effect.

== Present Status ==
According to Jitendra Singh, Union Minister of State, Science and Technology, as on 9 February 2022, the draft bill has completed public and legal consultation. It has now been sent for further approvals for inter-ministerial consultations.

In May 2025, the Chairperson of the Indian National Space Promotion and Authorization Centre (IN-SPACe), Pawan Goenka, confirmed that a new draft of the Space Activities Bill has been finalised. This 2025 version replaces the 2017 draft, which was officially shelved after being deemed 'obsolete' following significant criticism regarding its restrictive nature.

The redrafted bill is currently undergoing inter-ministerial consultations. Then government plans to initiate public consultations before seeking approval from the Prime Minister and the Cabinet for its introduction in Parliament. The legislation is intended to provide the legal framework necessary to expand India's space economy from 8.4 billion to 44 billion dollars by 2033.

=== Key Provisions of the 2025 re-draft ===
It reflects a policy shift from a "supply-based" to a "demand-based" model, incorporating feedback from over 400 private space companies and startups that have entered the sector since 2019.

- Statutory Empowerment of IN-SPACe: The bill proposes to grant statutory authority to IN-SPACe. Currently, the agency operates as an autonomous body under the Department of Space but lacks the formal legal power required to act as a definitive "single window" regulator for private entities.
- Insurance and Liability: Addressing a core industry demand, the bill includes provisions for accessible and affordable insurance for high-value space assets, which was previously a cost-prohibitive barrier for startups.
- Intellectual Property (IP) Reform: The draft amends a controversial 2017 clause that claimed all IP generated in outer space as government property. The new framework adopts an "industry-friendly" approach, likely allowing for case-by-case IP examinations or granting the government access without requiring full ownership.
- Offences and Penalties: The bill maintains a punitive framework for unauthorised space activities, including a potential three-year imprisonment and fines exceeding ₹1 crore for unlicensed operations or the pollution of outer space.

=== Decentralised Manufacturing Hubs ===
Under the updated framework, IN-SPACe is facilitating the establishment of specialised manufacturing hubs managed by state governments. As of 2025, three states have released specific space policies to host these hubs:

- Tamil Nadu: Focuses on the production of launch vehicles.
- Gujarat: Specialises in satellites and payloads.
- Karnataka: Serves as a general space hub, leveraging the existing industrial ecosystem in Bengaluru.

Discussions are currently underway with Maharashtra and other states to establish additional manufacturing parks, with a target of 4–5 initial hubs nationwide.
