= Mahesh Murthy =

Indian marketer, entrepreneur and investor

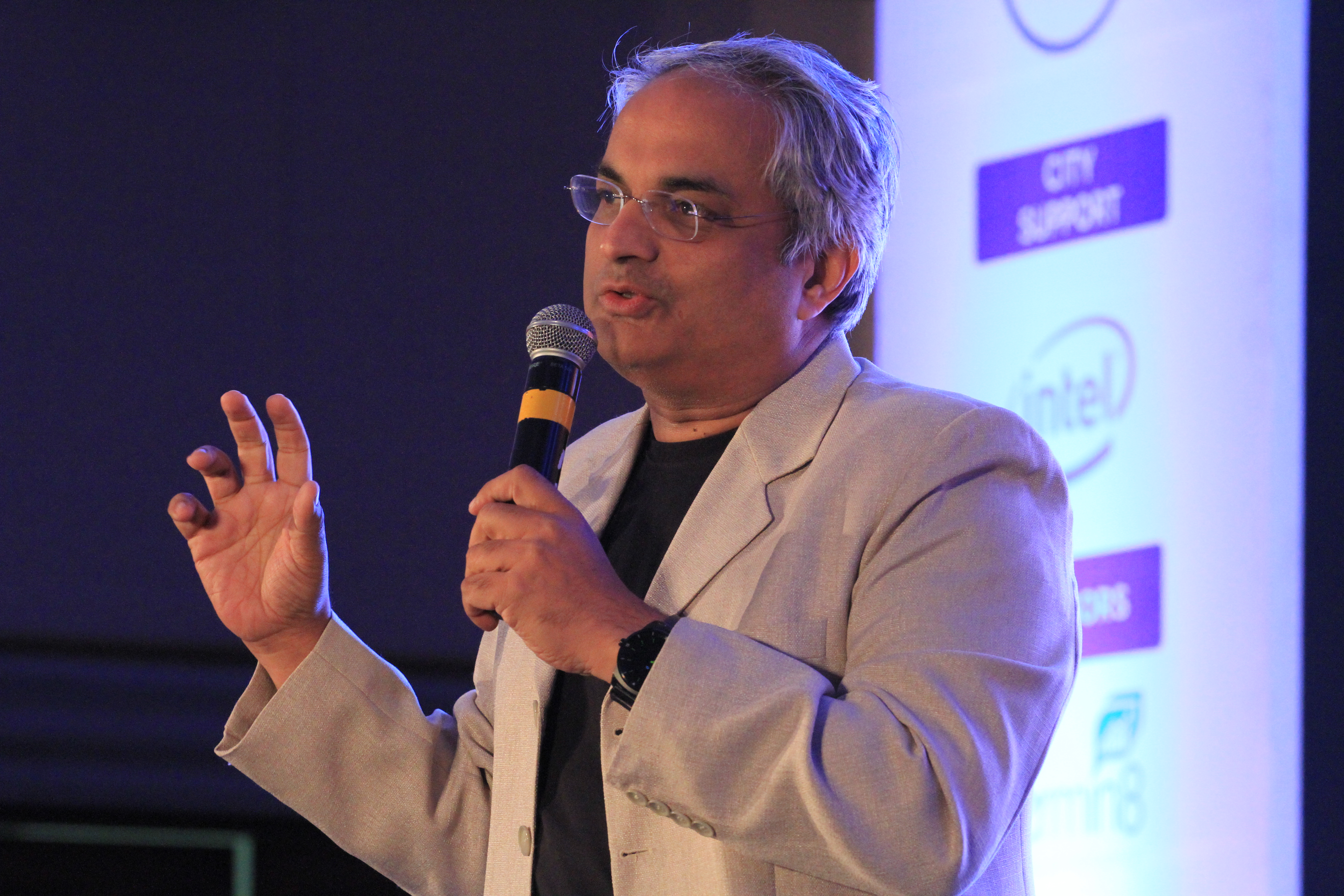
- Mahesh Murthy in February 2015
- Born: 11 September 1965 (age 60)
- Education: Osmania University
- Occupations: Marketer; entrepreneur; investor
- Notable work: Columns in WSJ, Business Today

Mahesh Murthy (born 11 September 1965) is an Indian marketer, entrepreneur, and investor. He is the founder of the digital agency Pinstorm.

== Early life and education ==
Mahesh Murthy was born and raised in a Tamil Brahmin family. His father served in the Indian Army and retired as a colonel. Murthty was accepted into Osmania University to study chemical engineering, from where he dropped out at the age of 17.

== Career ==
After leaving college, he worked as a vacuum cleaner salesman for Eureka Forbes and subsequently founded his first company, a cleaning service called Vaclean.

He worked for the advertising agency FCB (then FCB/Ulka) and Grey Advertising (then Trikaya Grey) in India, where he won multiple advertising awards for his work on HCL, Network and other clients.

He then moved to Ogilvy & Mather, Hong Kong as a creative head for clients across Asia. While at Hong Kong, in 1993, he wrote and directed a set of six films for MTV with Shashanka Ghosh, for which they won the New Directors Showcase award at the Cannes Lions.

He then moved to CKS Partners in Portland as Creative Director and General Manager, where he worked on the first graphical UI for Yahoo!, and later led the work on the web design as well as advertising for Amazon.com's "Earth's Biggest Bookstore" campaign.

He then went moved from advertising to e-commerce, as vice president of marketing for iCat, the Seattle-based publisher of e-commerce software that was acquired by Intel.

Murthy then was hired from the US and returned to India to run the rival to MTV, an Indian music television channel called Channel V. He acted as the General Manager for India and also helped create and launch its community youth site, vIndia.com.

In 2000, Murthy founded an angel fund, Passionfund, which funded companies such as Compassbox, Tulleeho, WebDunia, Geodesic and EBSDirect.

Murthy wrote columns for Business Today and BusinessWorld. He also wrote columns in the Wall Street Journal. Mahesh was an entrepreneur-in-residence at global business school INSEAD, where he taught entrepreneurship.

In 2004, he founded the digital marketing firm Pinstorm. Pinstorm is headquartered in Mumbai with offices in Amsterdam and Kathmandu. Pinstorm was among the world's first advertising firms to implement pay-for-performance advertising.

In 2006, he co-founded the early-stage venture capital fund Seedfund which funded and advised companies including RedBus, CarWale, SabKaDentist, Chumbak and Sportskeeda. Seedfund was awarded "India's best VC fund" at the Venture Intelligence awards for its first fund in 2009 and also for its second fund in 2013.

He was chosen as a "LinkedIn Power Profile" for India in 2012. He was also chosen as a "Top Writer" by Quora in 2014.

In 2014, his firm Pinstorm did work for the Aam Aadmi Party. Subsequently, there was a sudden spate of sexual harassment allegations against him, filed before the National Commission of Women, an organisation managed by the ruling party in India. Mahesh denied all allegations. The Mumbai Police registered a case against him, which was subsequently quashed by the Mumbai High Court.

Mahesh also opposed the Facebook Free Basics plan in India for free browsing offered to poor people only on sites approved by Facebook, which he termed "digital colonization". He helped drive a strong ground-up movement that eventually led to India's telecom regulator, Telecom Regulatory Authority of India (TRAI) outlawing it and Facebook dropping its plans – not just in India, but elsewhere as well.

Mahesh has recently announced his investments in the new space ecosystem. In 2017, he invested in Exseed Space, later renamed Satellize, a company that created history by launching India's first-ever private satellite to space, on board SpaceX. Exseed Space has since launched on ISRO's PSLV as well and was chosen by ISRO as one of the companies chosen to assemble, integrate and test its large, 2,000 kilogram and greater satellites. Exseed Space has been part of the team that helped a consortium build GSAT-30, GSAT-31 and RISAT 1A, which launched in 2021.
