= The Space Report =

The Space Report: The Authoritative Guide to Global Space Activity is published annually by the Space Foundation. The Space Report is the definitive overview of the global space industry and serves as a valuable resource for government and business leaders, educators, financial analysts, students, and space-relatedbusinesses.

Following are major findings from the 2013 issue.

The global space economy grew to $304.31 billion in commercial revenue and government budgets in 2012, reflecting growth of 6.7 percent from the 2011 total of $285.33 billion. Commercial activity - space products and services and commercial infrastructure - drove much of this increase. From 2007 through 2012, the total has grown by 37 percent.

Commercial space products and services revenue increased 6.5 percent since 2011, and commercial infrastructure and support industries increased by 11 percent.

Government spending increased by 1.3 percent in 2012, although changes varied significantly from country to country, with India, Russia and Brazil increasing budgets by more than 20 percent, while other nations, including several in Europe, experienced declines of 25 percent or more.

78 launch attempts took place in 2012, a drop of 7.1 percent from the 84 launches in 2011 (but higher than the 2010 total of 74). Russia led with 24 launches, China had 19 launches and the United States totaled 13 launches. For the second year running, the Chinese launch rate was greater than that of the United States. The United States led in terms of launch vehicle diversity, however, with ten types of orbital rockets launched in 2012.

According to U.S. Bureau of Labor Statistics (BLS) data, the size of the U.S. space workforce declined for the fifth year in a row, dropping 3.8 percent, from 252,315 in 2010 to 242,724 in 2011 (the most recent full year for which data is available) - a decrease of about 9,500 workers. However, the changes varied by sector, with some portions of the space industry growing while others contracted. The United States' National Aeronautics and Space Administration (NASA)'s civil servant workforce decreased from 18,709 in fiscal year (FY) 2012 to 18,167 in FY 2013, a drop of 2.9 percent. However, there is evidence that the employment situation in areas with significant Space Shuttle-related layoffs, including Florida, is beginning to improve.

Both Europe and Japan saw increases in space workforces; the European industry workforce showed very modest growth in 2011; in Japan, the overall workforce grew by 7.5 percent, while employment at the Japan Aerospace Exploration Agency (JAXA), Japan's government space agency, dropped.

== The Space Foundation Index ==
As of December 2012, the Space Foundation Index was 40.95 percent above its value at inception in June 2005. The Space Foundation Index and Space Foundation Services Index both outperformed the S&P 500 and the NASDAQ during 2012, while the Space Foundation Infrastructure Index did not perform as well as the NASDAQ, but slightly better than the S&P 500. These indexes, which are updated daily on the Space Foundation website, are easy-to-understand mechanisms for gauging the financial performance of space industry companies listed on U.S. stock exchanges.
