= Agnibaan SOrTeD =

Indian sub-orbital sounding rocket, developed by Agnikul Cosmos

- Function: Sounding rocket
- Manufacturer: AgniKul Cosmos
- Country of origin: India

Size
- Height: 6.2 m
- Mass: 575 kg
- Stages: 1

Associated rockets
- Based on: Agnibaan
- Comparable: Vikram-S, Black Brant (rocket), Rohini (rocket family)

Launch history
- Status: Active
- Launch sites: ALP-01
- Total launches: 1
- Success(es): 1
- First flight: 30 May 2024

First stage
- Engines: 1x Agnilet engine
- Thrust: 6.215 kN (1,397 lb_{f})
- Specific impulse: 186.5 seconds
- Burn time: 70 seconds
- Propellant: LOX and Aviation Turbine Fuel

Agnibaan SOrTeD (short form of 'SubOrbital Technological Demonstrator') is a suborbital technological demonstrator of the Agnibaan launch vehicle, manufactured by Indian space startup AgniKul Cosmos.

== Description ==
The SOrTeD mission is a single-stage launch vehicle demonstration that is powered by a semi-cryogenic engine called the Agnilet. The 6.2 meter-tall vehicle has an elliptical nose cone at the top to protect the payload from harsh conditions during the flight.

Unlike traditional sounding rockets that typically launch from guide rails, Agnibaan SOrTeD lifts off vertically and follows a predetermined trajectory while executing a precisely coordinated series of maneuvers during flight. This innovative approach sets Agnibaan apart and highlights the advanced technology and capabilities employed by AgniKul Cosmos for its maiden sub-orbital flight.

For flight control, the vehicle is equipped with four carbon composite fins to provide passive control. The active pitch and yaw control is achieved through two-plane gimballing, and together, these systems enable controlled vertical ascent. The company has integrated Agnibaan SOrTeD with the flight termination system developed by ISRO.

AgniKul had previously received authorization to establish a unique launch pad near the sea on Sriharikota Island, alongside its dedicated control room. The pad has received the name Dhanush and referred as ALP-01. AgniKul is the second Indian private spaceflight company to test its orbital launch system, following Skyroot Aerospace, who launched their Vikram-S rocket.

== Agnibaan SOrTeD-01 ==
=== Delays ===
On 21 March 2024, a day before launch, AgniKul Cosmos posted on X social network that they hold the launch based on certain minor observations from the full countdown rehearsals the previous night. The pre-launch procedures began ten hours before liftoff, with the filling of the fuel tanks, deployment of balloons for assessing winds at various altitudes, uploading the programme to the flight computer and getting a final clearance from the launch directors. The company postponed another launch attempt on 6 April 2024 while conducting pre-launch checks. Another launch attempt on 28 May 2024, was also called off, less than a minute before lift-off. The launch date was then set to 30 May 2024 for a fifth launch attempt.

=== Launch ===
The mission successfully lifted off on 30 May 2024 at 7:15 AM IST from India's first private launchpad, ALP-01, located close to ISRO facilities near Satish Dhawan Space Centre (SDSC).

The 580 kilogram rocket, with a thrust of 6.25 kN and propellant flow rate of 3.3 kg/s $(I_{sp} = 187 s)$, lifted off from Sriharikota for the first time and travelled as high as 20 kilometers above the Earth, before plunging down into the Bay of Bengal and carried about 7 kg of payloads. The data that it provides would help engineers fine-tune and shape the development of the Agnibaan launch vehicle, which is expected to fly by the last quarter of 2025.

==== Flight description ====
Following lift-off, the vehicle performed a pitch-over manoeuvre nearly four seconds into flight. This manoeuvre involves the controlled rotation of the vehicle to change its orientation from vertical to a predetermined angle with respect to the ground or its flight path.

The vehicle then went into the wind biasing manoeuvre at just over 39 seconds, which is introduced in rockets to compensate for the effects of wind on the trajectory of the rocket during ascent. At about 1 minute and 29 seconds into the flight, the rocket reached apogee, the point at which it is farthest from the launch site, before it splashes down at just over two minutes into flight, marking the completion of the mission.

== See also ==
- Space industry of India

=== Rockets with similar role ===
- SLV-3
- Vikram-S
