= Centum Electronics =

Indian electronics company

- Formerly: Solectron Centum Electronics
- Company type: Public
- Traded as: NSE: CENTUM; BSE: 517544
- ISIN: INE320B01020
- Industry: Technology; Aerospace; Defence; Transport; Healthcare
- Founded: 8 January 1993; 33 years ago
- Founder: Apparao Venkata Mallavarapu
- Headquarters: 44, KHB Industrial Area, Yelahanka Newtown, Bengaluru, Karnataka, India
- Areas served: India; Europe; North America
- Key people: Apparao Mallavarapu (Chairman and MD); Francois Cebes (CEO Centum Adetel)
- Revenue: ▼₹428.38 crore (US$45 million) (FY21)
- Operating income: ▼₹33.12 crore (US$3.5 million) (FY21)
- Net income: ▼₹23.97 crore (US$2.5 million) (FY21)
- Total assets: ▼₹534.29 crore (US$56 million) (FY21)
- Total equity: ▲₹254.67 crore (US$27 million) (FY21)
- Owners: Mallavarapu family (58.8%); Public shares (41.2%)
- Number of employees: 1,800 (FY21)
- Subsidiaries: Centum Adeneo (100%); Centum Electronics UK (100%); Centum Adetel Group SA (64.66%)
- Website: www.centumelectronics.com

Centum Electronics Limited is an Indian electronics system design and manufacturing company. The company produces subsystems and microelectronics, and provides system integration services. The company was incorporated in January 1993 and is headquartered in Bengaluru, Karnataka. Centum has a presence in 6 countries. It has manufacturing facilities, design, and sales and support teams in India, Canada, and France, a design team in Belgium, and sales and support teams in the United Kingdom and the United States. The company's British subsidiary, Centum Electronics UK Ltd., services all European customers except those in France.

Centum Electronics has multiple manufacturing facilities in Bangalore. The company opened its fourth Indian manufacturing facility at the Aerospace Park in Devanahalli, near Bangalore on 15 February 2017. Centum is one of the largest contractors to the Indian Space Research Organisation (ISRO) and supplies over 50 different varieties of components for satellites and launch vehicles. Centum opened a new space facility in Yelahanka, Bangalore to support ISRO missions in September 2019.

== History ==
Solectron Centum Electronics was founded on 8 January 1993 in Bangalore, Karnataka by Apparao Venkata Mallavarapu. The company was publicly listed on the Bombay Stock Exchange and the National Stock Exchange in 1994. Centum Electronics demerged its electronics manufacturing services division into Solectron EMS India Ltd in November 2006. The company changed its name to Centum Electronics in January 2013.

Centum acquired a 51% controlling stake in French company Adetel Group for an undisclosed amount in June 2016. In April 2018, Centum signed an agreement to sell its 51% stake in Centum Rakon India Pvt. Ltd., a joint venture with New Zealand company Rakon, to Rakon for US$5.5 million. Centum stated that it did not regard Centum Rakon, which primarily operated in the telecommunications industry, as "core to its strategy". The company increased its stake in Adetel Group to 64.66% in December 2020.

The company was awarded the Defence Research and Development Organisation's Defence Technology Absorption Award by Defence Minister Rajnath Singh in January 2021 for its work on the EMISAT. In March 2021, Kalyani Rafael Advanced Systems CEO Rudra Jadeja stated that Centum Electronics was among the companies that contributed to the manufacture of Spice 2000 bombs including those used in the 2019 Balakot airstrike.

Centum Electronics has been a partner of the non-profit Akshaya Patra Foundation since the 2000s. Between 2010 and 2020, Centum stated that it had sponsored meals for 360,000 school children at public and Government-aided schools in Bangalore.

== Industry collaboration ==
An agreement has been signed by Nibe Space, a division of Nibe Defence and Aerospace on 9 September 2024, with Centum Electronics, Skyroot Aerospace, AgniKul Cosmos, SpaceFields, Sisir Radar, CYRAN AI Solutions, and Larsen & Toubro for the launch of India's first constellation of multi-sensor, all-weather, high-revisit Earth observation satellites.
