= The ePlane Company =

- Type: Private
- Industry: Aerospace
- Founded: 2019 in Chennai, India
- Founder: Prof. Satyanarayanan Chakravarthy
- Headquarters: IITM Discovery Campus, Chennai, India
- Products: Electric vertical take-off and landing aircraft
- Parent: Ubifly Technologies Private Limited
- Website: www.eplane.ai

The ePlane Company (TEC) is an Indian aerospace company based in Chennai, Tamil Nadu. It develops electric vertical take-off and landing (eVTOL) aircraft. The company was incorporated at the Indian Institute of Technology Madras and operates under Ubifly Technologies Private Limited.

== History ==
The ePlane Company originated from research and development activities at the Indian Institute of Technology Madras. It was founded by aerospace engineering professor Satyanarayanan Chakravarthy. The company was established in 2019.

In December 2020, the company announced an undisclosed seed funding round led by Speciale Invest, with participation from CIIE.CO, FirstCheque, Java Capital. The company said the funding would be used to expand its engineering team, infrastructure and aircraft development activities.

The ePlane Company has raised capital across multiple financing rounds from venture capital firms and strategic technology investors. The company secured $0.87 million in its Seed round in November 2020, followed by a $4.95 million Series A round in December 2021. In late 2024, the company closed a $13.38 million Series B round.

In addition to equity funding, the Technology Development Board (TDB) under the Department of Science and Technology (DST), Government of India, approved ₹285 crore (approximately $34 million) in financial support under the Research, Development and Innovation (RDI) Fund in September 2026. This non-dilutive support is dedicated to taking the flagship e200X aircraft from Technology Readiness Level 6 (TRL-6) to commercial airworthiness at TRL-9.

In 2026, The ePlane Company entered into strategic partnerships with Apollo Hospitals and Noida International Airport (YIAPL) to establish the operational and ground infrastructure for Advanced Air Mobility (AAM). The collaboration with Apollo Hospitals focuses on integrating the e200X for rapid "Golden Hour" emergency air ambulance dispatch, while the agreement with Noida International Airport covers vertiport allocation, charging infrastructure, airspace SOP integration, and phased drone trials ahead of commercial passenger air taxi and medical flights in Delhi-NCR.

== Research and development ==
TEC conducts research and development in electric propulsion, aircraft design and eVTOL aircraft. The company's research originated by its founder Satyanarayanan Chakravarthy who is involved in research related to aircraft propulsion and electric aviation.

TEC's development programme has included the design and testing of electric aircraft prototypes. It has worked on distributed electric propulsion systems and aircraft configurations intended for vertical and/or short take-off and landing (V/STOL). The company has also developed smaller-scale prototypes as part of the process of testing its propulsion, flight-control and aerodynamic systems.

The company's research programme includes the development of aircraft for urban passenger transportation. Later the company started eVTOL aircraft and an Air ambulance configuration.

In 2023, the company obtained Design Organisation Approval from India's Directorate General of Civil Aviation (India) for its aircraft design activities within the regulatory framework applicable to civil aviation.

TEC developed electric aircraft for short-distance passenger and cargo transportation. Its eVTOL aircraft is designed for urban transportation.

=== e200X ===
TEC designed and developed India's first eVTOL aircraft e200X. It is a 2.2-ton fully electric eVTOL capable of carrying up to 200 kg of cargo over distances of up to 110 km.

The company has partnered with German avionics firm Hensoldt to supply and integrate avionics systems for its e200X. The aircraft is designed and developed by using NVIDIA Omniverse libraries.
