= Ananth Technologies =

Indian aerospace manufacturer

- Type: Private
- Industry: Aerospace
- Founded: 17 August 1992; 34 years ago in Hyderabad
- Founder: Subba Rao Pavuluri
- Headquarters: 39, Ananth Info Park, Phase-II, HITEC City, Madhapur, Hyderabad, Telangana, India
- Number of locations: 3 (2021)
- Area served: Worldwide
- Key people: Subba Rao Pavuluri (Chairman and MD)
- Revenue: ▲₹152.71 crore (US$16 million) (FY20)
- Number of employees: 1200+ (March 2021)
- Divisions: Aerospace; Geospatial
- Subsidiaries: SaAn Satellite Networks India
- Website: ananthtech.com

Ananth Technologies Limited is an Indian aerospace manufacturer that provides hardware and software services. The company manufactures electronics and mechanical subsystems for launch vehicles, satellites, spacecraft payloads, and ground systems. It also builds satellites and provides launch services through a partnership with NewSpace India Limited. Ananth Technologies was established in 1992 and is headquartered in Hyderabad, Telangana. The company also has an office in Thiruvananthapuram, Kerala and a satellite manufacturing facility near Bangalore, Karnataka.

== History ==
Ananth Technologies was incorporated on 17 August 1992 in Hyderabad by Dr.Subba Rao Pavuluri, a former employee of the Indian Space Research Organisation (ISRO). Pavuluri was a division head at ISRO when he left in 1991. He explained, "I left midway because of the encouragement they gave me that things can be done in the private sector to serve ISRO and also grow independently". Ananth Technologies was one of the first private sector space companies in India.

Ananth Technologies opened a new satellite manufacturing facility at Aerospace Park in Devanahalli, near Bengaluru, Karnataka in February 2020. Pavuluri told The Economic Times that the company had signed deals to build and launch 6 satellites for customers in France and Sweden. He stated that the satellites would weigh between 50 kg and 250 kg each, but did not disclose the names of the customers citing confidentiality. The deal made Ananth Technologies the first private Indian company to build satellites for a foreign customer following the Indian government's decision to permit private sector companies to build satellites and rockets, and offer launch services.

In November 2020, Ananth Technologies established a joint venture named SaAn Satellite Networks India, with United States-based satellite operator Saturn Satellite Networks Inc., to build and launch two NationSat communication satellites. The company will build the two 300–700 kg satellites at its Bangalore facility. Ananth Technologies has an agreement with NewSpace India Limited to launch satellites on board the ISRO's Polar Satellite Launch Vehicle.

== Projects ==
The company's Thiruvananthapuram office worked closely with ISRO on PSLV-C51 which successfully launched on 28 February 2021. Ananth Technologies conducted stage integration and checkout on the PSLV mission, marking the first time that ISRO had contracted a private sector company to undertake the task.

In 2024, Ananth Technologies worked with U R Rao Satellite Centre to finish the satellite assembly, integration, and testing for SpaDeX mission. For the SpaDeX satellites, Ananth Technologies provided Rendezvous Processing Units (RPU) and DC-to-DC converters. Additionally, the company provided 29 essential components for the PSLV-C60 launch vehicle, such as data acquisition units, transmitters, power modules, NavIC chip and control modules, and it also carried out assembly, integration, and testing of several PSLV-C60 sub-assemblies. The firm also supplied 46 sub-components for the GSLV rocket, supporting a new data-relay package that has been integrated on the rocket from flight F18.
