= Pawan Kumar Goenka =

Indian businessman

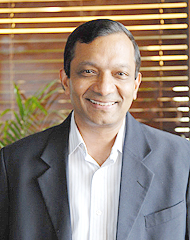
- Born: Harpalpur, Madhya Pradesh, India
- Education: IIT Kanpur (BTech); Cornell University (PhD)
- Occupations: Managing director, Mahindra & Mahindra; Chairman, SsangYong Motor Company
- Spouse: Mamta Goenka

Pawan Kumar Goenka is an Indian businessman, and the retired Managing Director of Mahindra & Mahindra, an Indian multinational automobile manufacturing corporation headquartered in Mumbai, and the chairman of SsangYong Motor Company in Korea. He is currently the Chairman of INSPACE, a part of India's Space Program. He is also the present Chairman of the Board of Governors of IIT Madras.

In January 2025, Goenka was honored with the Padma Shri, India's fourth-highest civilian award, by the Government of India.

== Early life and education ==
Goenka did his schooling in Shree jain Vidyalaya, Kolkata, and then earned his BTech in mechanical engineering from IIT Kanpur and PhD from Cornell University. He attended a six-week Advanced Management Program at Harvard Business School. He worked at General Motors R&D Centre in Detroit, U.S., from 1979 to 1993. Thereafter he joined Mahindra & Mahindra Ltd., as general manager (R&D).

== Career ==
Goenka joined Mahindra in October 1993 as the general manager, R&D. He was appointed as the chief operating officer for the automotive sector in April 2003. In September 2005, he became the president of the automotive sector and by April 2010 he was the president of the automotive and farm equipment sectors. "He was appointed to the post of Executive Director of Mahindra & Mahindra in 2013 and in April 2014, he took over the additional responsibility of the two wheeler business. In Nov 2016 Dr Pawan Kumar Goenka was elevated to the post of Managing Director of M&M."

Goenka is the past president of SIAM, Society of Automotive Engineers India, and ARAI Governing Council, and was a board member of National Skills Development Corporation (NSDC) from August 2013 to August 2014. He is also a national council member of CII, and chairman of board of governors of IIT Madras. In September 2021, Goenka was selected by the ACC as the chairperson of INSPACe.

== Awards and honors ==
- 2025: Padma Shri
- 2022 Asian Scientist 100, Asian Scientist
- Engineering Excellence Award 2012 from SAE India Foundation
- CV Man of the Year 2012 by Apollo CV Awards
- Man of the Year 2007 and 2011 by Autocar Professional
- Fellow of SAE International in 2004
- Fellow of INAE (Indian National Academy of Engineers) in 2004
- Distinguished Alumni Award from I.I.T. Kanpur in 2004
- Outstanding International Advisor Award by SAE in 1997
- Charles L. McCuen Achievement Award for the years 1985 & 1991
- Extraordinary Accomplishment Award from General Motors in 1986

== Personal life ==
Goenka is married to Mamta Goenka who "volunteers her time to counsel cancer patients and help them receive proper treatment and post-operative care".
