= LeoLabs =

American space technology company

LeoLabs is an American space technology company specializing in the tracking of satellites and space debris in low Earth orbit (LEO). Founded in 2016 as a spin-off from SRI International, LeoLabs is headquartered in Menlo Park, California.

The radar network enables tracking of objects as small as 2 centimeters, contributing significantly to collision avoidance and space traffic safety in the increasingly congested LEO environment. As of late 2025, LeoLabs operates 11 radar installations across seven global sites, with locations in the United States (including Alaska, Texas, and Arizona), New Zealand, Costa Rica, Australia, Portugal’s Azores archipelago, and Argentina.

In June 2021, the company completed a $65 million Series B financing round. Financing has continued with an additional $29 million raised in February 2024.

The company secured more than $50 million in contracts during 2024, marking nearly 140% revenue growth from the previous year. In the first half of 2024 alone, LeoLabs won over $20 million in new contracts to deliver space domain awareness and traffic management services to U.S. and allied government agencies, as well as commercial satellite operators.
