= Anil Kumar Bhatt =

Former military secretary of the Indian Army

Lieutenant General Anil Kumar Bhatt PVSM, UYSM, AVSM, SM, VSM
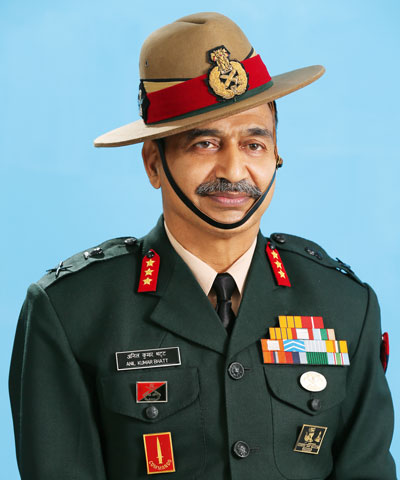
- Born: Khatwar, Tehri Garhwal, Uttarakhand, India
- Military career
- Allegiance: India
- Branch: Indian Army
- Service years: 1981–2020
- Rank: Lieutenant General
- Service number: IC-40022F
- Unit: 9 Gorkha Rifles
- Commands: XV Corps; 21 Mountain Division
- Awards: Uttam Yudh Seva Medal; Ati Vishisht Seva Medal; Sena Medal; Vishisht Seva Medal

Lieutenant General Anil Kumar Bhatt, PVSM, UYSM, AVSM, SM, VSM was the Military Secretary of the Indian Army. Prior to this, he served as the 47th Commander, XV Corps of the Indian Army between 1 February 2018 and 7 February 2019. Prior to this he was the Director General of Military operations for one year including during the Doklam crisis in 2017. During his tenure as Corps Commander maximum terrorists were neutralized in comparison to the last one decade.

== Early life and education ==
Bhatt was born in Khatwaad village of Tehri Garhwal district, in Uttarakhand. He is alumnus of St. George's College, Mussoorie; Indian Military Academy, Dehradun and Staff College, Camberley, United Kingdom.

== Career ==
Bhatt was commissioned into 9 Gorkha Rifles (Chindits) in 1981. He has served three times in Jammu and Kashmir. He has held several important posts including Commander of 21 Mountain Division (Rangiya); Director General of Military Operations (DGMO); Additional Director General of CAB (Complaint and Advisory Board) at Army HQ and an instructor at Commando School, Belgaum. He is also the Colonel of the Regiment for 9 Gorkha Rifles and has represented India as the deputy Force Provost Marshal in Lebanon.

During his career of 36 years, he has been awarded the Uttam Yudh Seva Medal in 2019 for many successful operations, including elimination of the highest number of militants — 259 — in a year over a decade. Ati Vishisht Seva Medal (2015), Sena Medal, Vishisht Seva Medal for his service.

He was made the first Director General of Indian Space Association inaugurated on October 11, 2021.

== Honours and decorations ==

Uttam Yudh Seva Medal		Ati Vishisht Seva Medal	
Sena Medal	Vishisht Seva Medal	Special Service Medal	Operation Parakram Medal
Sainya Seva Medal	High Altitude Service Medal	Videsh Seva Medal	50th Anniversary of Independence Medal
30 Years Long Service Medal	20 Years Long Service Medal	9 Years Long Service Medal	UNIFIL

Military offices
Preceded by Jaswinder Singh Sandhu	General Officer Commanding XV Corps; 1 February 2018 - 07 February 2019	Succeeded by Kanwal Jeet Singh Dhillon
Preceded by Ranbir Singh	Director General of Military Operations; 28 November 2016 - 30 January 2018	Succeeded by Anil Chauhan
Preceded by	General Officer Commanding 21 Mountain Division	Succeeded by
