= Satellize =

Indian aerospace company

- Formerly: Exseed Space
- Type: Private
- Industry: Aerospace industry
- Founded: 2018; 8 years ago
- Founders: Mahesh Murthy; Asshar Farhan
- Headquarters: Mumbai, India
- Key people: Mahesh Murthy (director); Asshar Farhan (director)
- Services: Satellite imagery, data gathering, communication
- Website: satellize.com

Satellize (formerly known as Exseed Space) is the first private Indian company to have a satellite in space. In December 2018, its first satellite was launched by SpaceX. It launched its second satellite, AISAT (called ExseedSat-2) for a customer, AMSAT (Radio Amateur Satellite Corporation) India on board the fourth stage of the PSLV-C45.

Exseed Innovations was started in 2017 by Mahesh Murthy, Asshar Farhan, and Kris Nair in Hyderabad. Its focus is on "assembly, integration, testing and operation of satellites", and it seeks to "democratize space exploration".

== See also ==
- List of private spaceflight companies
- Pixxel
- Skyroot Aerospace
