= MapmyIndia =

Indian technology company

- Formerly: C.E. Infosystems Pvt. Ltd. (1995–2021)
- Type: Public
- Traded as: NSE: MAPMYINDIA; BSE: 543425
- Industry: Technology; Mapping data; GPS navigation software; Web mapping
- Founded: 1995; 31 years ago
- Founder: Rakesh Verma; Rashmi Verma
- Headquarters: Okhla Phase-III, New Delhi, India
- Area served: Indian subcontinent
- Key people: Rakesh Verma (CMD); Rohan Verma (CEO); Rashmi Verma (CTO); Sapna Ahuja (COO); Ankeet Bhat (CSO); Anuj Jain (CFO)
- Brands: Mappls
- Services: IoT, Navigation, Maps, GIS Services
- Owner: CE Info Systems Ltd. (Cestem)
- Number of employees: 1410
- Website: www.mapmyindia.com

MapmyIndia is an Indian technology company that builds digital map data, telematics services, location-based SaaS and GIS AI technologies. The company was founded in 1995 and is headquartered at New Delhi with regional offices in Mumbai and Bengaluru and smaller offices across India. It also has international offices in the San Francisco Bay Area and Tokyo.

== History ==
MapmyIndia was founded by Rakesh and Rashmi Verma in 1995. The couple launched a startup called CE Info Systems in 1995 at New Delhi, India. The company started working upon developing a web mapping technology and provide products and services required for enhancing marketing and logistics efficiency in existing organizations in the country. Soon after, the company took up an assignment to develop good quality maps with detailed topography to support the marketing and logistics operations of Coca-Cola and Cellular One.

The company launched the first Indian interactive digital mapping portal "www.mapmyindia.com" in 2004. This portal provided free, customized, location-based services including assigning an e-location to existing addresses to enable last mile deliveries to their exact destinations. The services were available for mobile phones with internet connectivity also. These services were also provided through the MapmyIndia portal to MagicBricks.

In 2010, MapmyIndia launched a GPS navigation service called Road Pilot, preloaded with Indian cities, villages and destinations. The company's online maps are integrated with ISRO Satellite Imagery for detailed satellite and hybrid.

In 2014, MapmyIndia launched a voice-navigation app called NaviMaps, that supported various languages spoken in India, including Hindi, Bengali, Gujarati, Kannada, Malayalam, Marathi, Oriya, Punjabi, Tamil and Telugu.

In 2020, MapmyIndia launched a COVID-19 dashboard.

MapmyIndia won the Government of India's AatmaNirbhar Bharat App Innovation Challenge for its consumer app, Move.

== Product and services ==
MapmyIndia offers Navigation, Tracking, IoT, Analytics and web mapping service for desktop and mobile devices. The company also offers advanced GPS tracking devices, car in-dash infotainment & plug & play on-board diagnostics car tracker. The navigation service features street view, public transit information and turn-by-turn navigation with spoken instructions for vehicles. It later launched offline navigation app, Navimaps that uses offline vector data to offer 3D terrains and city models and 3D building for in-car infotainment systems.

== Market share ==
The company's navigation and location services are primarily used by vehicle manufacturers (cars, bikes, commercial vehicles, electric vehicles) and it claims to have 90% market share on GPS navigation in India. It also claims to have 5,000 enterprise customers with 80% market share in the location intelligence sector. MapmyIndia's cloud mapping services are also used by many developers and tech companies in India such as PhonePe, Paytm, Amazon, Alexa voice, Flipkart, Uber, Apple, etc. for planning, operations and customer experience.

== Funding ==
MapmyIndia has raised $34 million in venture capital financing in the three rounds since 2007 from the Lightbox Ventures, Nexus Venture Partners, Qualcomm Ventures and Zenrin. In 2015, Flipkart announced that it has acquired 34% stake of the company for Rs 1,600 crores and provided a successful exit to MapmyIndia's early investors.
