= Indian National Space Promotion and Authorisation Centre =

Agency in India's Department of Space

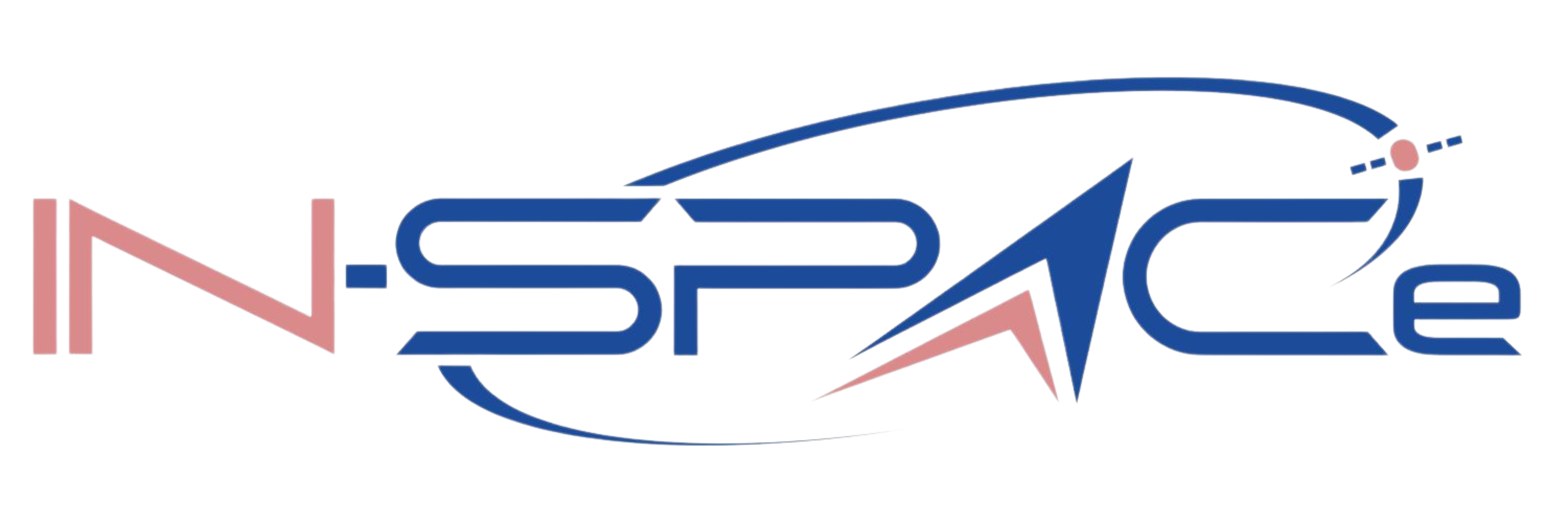

Centre overview
- Formed: 24 June 2020; 6 years ago
- Jurisdiction: Government of India
- Headquarters: Ahmedabad, Gujarat, India
- Minister responsible: Narendra Modi, Prime Minister of India and Minister of Space
- Deputy Minister responsible: Jitendra Singh, Minister of State for Space
- Centre executives: Dr. Pawan Goenka, Chairman; Smt. Sandhya Venugopal Sharma, IAS, (Additional Secretary, DoS); Shri A. Rajarajan, (Director, SDSC-SHAR, ISRO); Shri Shantanu Bhatawdekar, (Scientific Secretary, ISRO); Shri Nilesh M. Desai, (Director, SAC, ISRO); Dr. Shailesh Nayak, (Director, NIAS); Shri Tej Pal Singh, (Director General BISAG-N); Shri Lochan Sehra, IAS, (Joint Secretary, IN-SPACe); Shri Atul Dinkar Rane, (CEO & MD, Brahmos Aerospace)
- Parent department: Department of Space, Government of India
- Website: www.inspace.gov.in

Indian National Space Promotion and Authorisation Centre (IN-SPACe) is a single-window autonomous agency under the Department of Space of the Government of India. The establishment of IN–SPACe was announced in June 2020 by the Minister of State for Space Jitendra Singh, with the Union Cabinet approving its creation.

In the same month, Secretary (Space) and chairperson of ISRO, K. Sivan said that it would take up to six months to operationalize IN-SPACe, with the Department of Space handling its functions in the meantime.

IN-SPACe, ISRO and NSIL at 9th Bengaluru Space Expo 2026, BIEC

== History ==
The space program in India has been developed over a period of more than five decades with a goal of creating practical applications for the population. In the process, it has become one of the six largest space agencies in the world. ISRO maintains one of the largest fleets of GEO communication and LEO remote sensing satellites, which cater to the growing demand for fast and reliable communication and earth observation respectively.

Over the years, ISRO has developed several industries and Micro, Small and Medium Enterprises (MSMEs) as supply chain partners in realization of launch vehicles and satellites. In view of the growing space sector business across the globe, it is found prudent to enable NGEs to carry out independent space activities.

In order to achieve this objective, the Union Cabinet led by the Prime Minister Narendra Modi took the historic decision in June 2020 to open up the Space sector and enable the participation of Indian private sector in the entire gamut of space activities. To facilitate private sector participation, the government has created the Indian National Space Promotion and Authorisation Centre (IN-SPACe), as a single-window, independent, nodal agency which functions as an autonomous agency in Department of Space (DOS). Established as a single window agency for all space sector activities of private entities, IN-SPACe plays an important role in boosting the private space sector economy in India.

IN-SPACe is responsible for promoting, enabling, authorising, and supervising various space activities of the NGEs. These activities include, among others, the construction of launch vehicles and satellites, the provision of space-based services, the sharing of space infrastructure and premises under the control of DOS/ISRO, and the establishment of new space infrastructure and facilities.

Three Directorates viz., Promotion Directorate (PD), Technical Directorate (TD) and Program Management and Authorization Directorate (PMAD) are carrying out the functions of IN-SPACe.

== Functions ==
IN-SPACe will act as a link between the ISRO and private sector companies, assessing "how best to utilise India’s space resources and increase space-based activities." The centre will evaluate demands of private sector companies—including educational institutes—and will find ways to attune their demands, in consultation with ISRO. Sivan told that the centre's decisions would be binding on both ISRO and private sector organisations. The space sector was earlier regulated by ISRO, but, now the organisation will focus on its core activity of research and development.

=== Ground station as a service ===
The viability of Ground Station As a Service (GSaaS) for the private sector on ISRO property is being investigated by IN-SPACe. Ground station operations will be outsourced by GSaaS to specialized service providers who charge a subscription fee or pay-per-use for a variety of services. It would result in reduced requirements for housing several stations at the same location, financial advantages, resource efficiency, improved service coverage, and cooperative innovation. Dhruva Space's application to offer GSaaS services was approved by IN-SPACe. Six ground stations in VHF and UHF bands, as well as two in S and/or X bands, have been designed and constructed by the startup. Azista Aerospace has also been authorized by IN-SPACe to establish a ground station in the UHF frequency band. In addition to offering GSaaS for operations and data receipt from remote-sensing satellites to both Indian and foreign clients, Azista BST Aerospace will service its satellites.

=== Investment fund ===
In February 2025, IN-SPACe announced a ₹500 crore (equivalent to ₹516 crore or US$55 million in 2026) Technology Adoption Fund (TAF), which will be used to assist space technology companies, with a focus on assisting startups and MSMEs in developing commercially-viable products.

=== Satellite bus as a service ===
In April 2025, IN-SPACe launched the Satellite Bus as a Service (SBaaS) initiative. The SBaaS initiative provides a pathway for private sector Indian space companies to design and develop small satellite bus platforms for hosted payload uses. The SBaaS initiative also aims to reduce India's dependence on importing foreign satellite-bus platforms.

== Organisation ==
According to Secretary (Space) and chairman of ISRO, K. Sivan, IN-SPACe is an autonomous body with its own board—with some members from the private sector and industry —and chairperson. Dr. Pawan Kumar Goenka, is the Chairman of IN-SPACe. The centre have three directorates namely Promotion, technical and Program Management and Authorisation.

== See also ==
- ISRO
- Indian Space Association
- Space industry of India
