= Space industry =

Activities related to manufacturing components that go into Earth's orbit or beyond

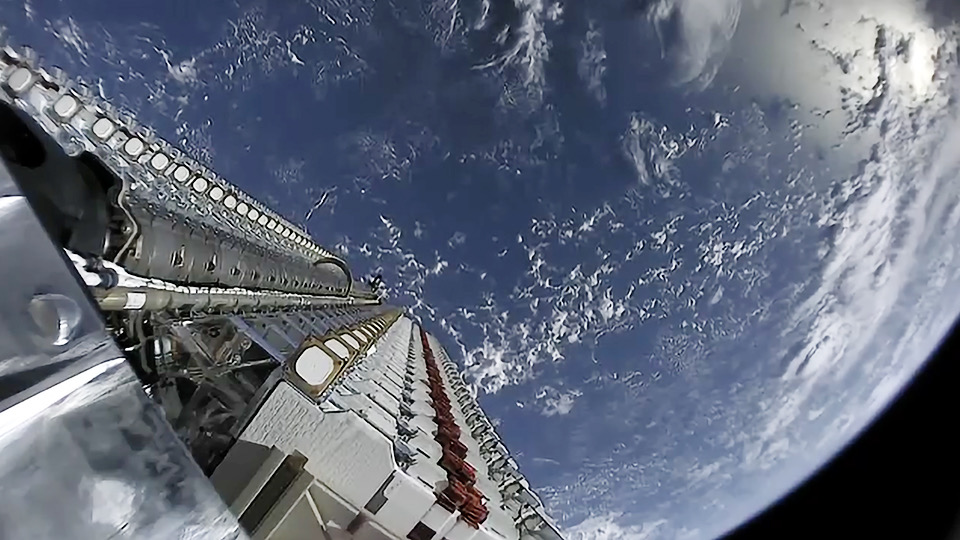
A batch of 60 Starlink satellites in space, which are launched and made by SpaceX

Space industry refers to economic activities related to manufacturing components that go into outer space (Earth's orbit or beyond), delivering them to those regions, and related services. Owing to the prominence of satellite-related activities, some sources use the term satellite industry interchangeably with the term space industry. The term space business has also been used.

A narrow definition of the space industry typically encompasses only hardware providers (primarily those that manufacture launch vehicles and satellites). This definition does not exclude certain activities, such as space tourism.

Therefore, more broadly, the space industry can be described as the activities of the companies and organizations involved in the space economy, and providing goods and services related to space. The space economy has been defined as "all public and private actors involved in developing and providing space-enabled products and services. It comprises a long value-added chaining, starting with research and development actors and manufacturers of space hardware and ending with the providers of space-enabled products and services to final users."

== Segments and revenues ==
The three major sectors of the space industry are: satellite manufacturing, support ground equipment manufacturing, and the launch industry. The satellite manufacturing sector is composed of satellite developers and integrators, and subsystem manufacturers. The ground equipment sector is composed of companies that manufacture systems such as mobile terminals, gateways, control stations, VSATs, direct broadcast satellite dishes, and other specialized equipment. The launch sector is composed of launch services, vehicle manufacturing and subsystem manufacturing.

Every euro spent in the space industry returns around six euros to the economy, according to the European Space Agency. This makes it a critical sector for economic development, competitiveness, and high-tech jobs. With regards to the worldwide satellite industry revenues, in the period 2002 to 2005 those remained at the 35–36 billion USD level. In that, majority of revenue was generated by the ground equipment sector, with the least amount by the launch sector. Space-related services are estimated at US$100 billion. The industry and related sectors employ about 120,000 people in the OECD countries, while the space industry of Russia employs around 250,000 people. Capital stocks estimated the worth of 937 satellites in Earth's orbit in 2005 at around 170 to US$230 billion. In 2005, OECD countries budgeted around US$45 billion for space-related activities; income from space-derived products and services has been estimated at US$110–120 billion in 2006 (worldwide).

== History and trends ==
The space industry began to develop after World War II, as rockets and then satellites entered into military arsenals, and later found civilian applications. It retains significant ties to the government. In particular, the launch industry features a significant government involvement, with some launch platforms (such as the Space Shuttle) being operated by governments.

In recent years, however, private spaceflight is becoming realistic, and even major government agencies, such as NASA, have begun relying on privately operated launch services. Some future developments of the space industry that are increasingly being considered include new services such as space tourism.

From 2004 to 2013, total orbital launches by country/region were: Russia: 270, US: 181, China: 108, Europe: 59, Japan: 24, India: 19 and Brazil: 1.

Relevant trends in the 2008–2009 for the space industry included:

- the appearance of new satellite operators;
- a growing demand for Fixed Service Satellites and developing market for Mobile Satellite Services;
- a steady amount of commercial satellite orders;
- steady performance of the launch sector;
- resilience to the 2008 financial crisis;
- maturing markets for services like Ka-band and remote sensing.

The 2019 Space Report estimates that in 2018 total global space activity was $414.75 Billion. Of that, the report estimates that 21%, or $87.09 Billion, was from U.S. Government Space Budgets.

A report discussing global space spending in 2021 estimated global spending at approximately $92 billion.

The Space Report for Q4 2023 identified 2023 as the busiest year on record for space activities, with 223 launch attempts and 212 successful launches. More than 2,800 satellites were deployed into orbit, a 23% increase from 2022, and commercial launch activity saw a 50% increase compared to 2022. In 2025, there were 321 orbital launches, and 4,517 satellites were deployed into orbit.

== Environmental accountability ==
=== Environmental impact type ===
==== Space debris ====
There are currently about 9,100 active payloads in Earth's orbit, 26,000 space debris larger than 10 cm and millions of smaller pieces (1 cm or greater in diameter). The debris is increasingly likely to trigger the Kessler effect - a chain reaction in which collisions create more debris and eventually render low-Earth orbit unusable.A satellite collision in 2009 produced more than 2,000 pieces of traceable debris.

==== Ozone layer destruction ====
Chlorine gas released from solid rocket fuels (such as chlorinated APCP) can cause ozone depletion. Some scholars believe that the continued increase in rocket launches and the continued use of solid rocket fuels will in the future offset the efforts to repair ozone layer since the Montreal Protocol. If a crewed rocket were launched 1,000 times a year for space tourism, its release of hydrocarbon-based HRE would cause ozone loss of up to 6% in the polar regions.

==== Astronomical interference ====
These satellites reflect sunlight to form "artificial constellations" during the morning and evening hours, with an apparent magnitude of +4.6 (visible to the naked eye), well above the safety threshold of +7 recommended by the International Astronomical Union (IAU).The launch of large satellite constellations, such as the SpaceX Starlink program, can cause interference with optical astronomical observations, which the IAU strongly protested and issued a statement.

==== Danger of extraterrestrial biological contamination ====
While the Apollo program achieved the feat of landing humans on the moon, 96 packages of human waste with a total mass of more than 2,500 grams were left on the lunar surface. It contains microbes that could survive and biocontaminate the moon. The disinfection procedures for the 2021 Perseverance (rover) have been called into question as inadequate, with microbial containment measures exposing systemic flaws that could contaminate potential samples of Martian life.

=== Controversies and Challenges ===
==== Lack of environmental responsibility in commercial aviation activities ====
The explosion during Starship's first orbital test flight failure in April 2023 released large amounts of methane and particulate matter, and SpaceX said there was "no significant environmental risk," but did not disclose how much methane was released as a result of the accident.

SpaceX's Starship rocket uses liquid oxygen methane as fuel. Its global warming potential (GWP) is 84 times that of carbon dioxide over a 20-year period. The company does not disclose methane escape rates for a single launch or black carbon emissions from incomplete combustion, nor does it provide an estimate of total annual emissions for its planned 100 Falcon launches in 2023.

Blue Origin's New Shepard rocket uses liquid hydrogen fuel, which burns as water vapor. However, when hydrogen is produced by natural gas reforming, indirect carbon emissions per kg of hydrogen are up to 9.3 kg CO_{2}. The company does not disclose the full carbon footprint of its supply chain.

==== Responsibility definition problem ====
The ambiguity of the current international space law leads to the difficulty of liability for environmental damage. According to the 1972 Convention on International Liability for Damage Caused by Space Objects, the launching state is only absolutely liable for "negligent damage", but there is no clear definition of "indirect damage" (such as the chain reaction caused by the collision of orbital debris). The uncontrolled re-entry of the Soviet nuclear-powered satellite Kosmos 1402 in 1982 was not responsible for the spread of radioactive material because international law at the time did not cover the long-term risks of nuclear-powered satellites. Similarly, the 2019 Indian anti-satellite test (Mission Shakti) produced more than 400 pieces of traceable debris, one of which came close to the orbit of the Chinese space station, sparking diplomatic protests. However, the Liability Convention does not provide for liability for debris resulting from weapons tests.

==== The regulatory framework lag ====
Article 9 of the Outer Space Treaty, currently international law, requires states to refrain from "harmful pollution" of the extraterrestrial environment. But the treaty does not require space activities to disclose environmental data.

Article 10 of the Artemis Accords states that signatories should set standards for "sustainable space exploration," but it also does not set mandatory or substantive targets. At the same time, China and Russia, as aviation powers, are not part of the Accords.

At the national and local levels, there are few policies regulating the impact of space launches on the local environment, for example, existing policies in the United States are limited to general regulations by the Environmental Protection Agency (EPA), and the Commercial Space Launch Act of 1984 does not include carbon emissions in the evaluation criteria for launch permits.

=== Future direction ===
The Global Space Sustainability Rating (SSR) system is a global assessment mechanism jointly launched by the World Economic Forum, the European Space Agency, the Massachusetts Institute of Technology and other institutions in 2021. It aims to conduct a full-cycle sustainability assessment of the space activities of commercial space companies of various countries, promote the rating results to be used as the investment and financing entry threshold of financial institutions such as the International Monetary Fund and the World Bank, and incorporate them into the United Nations Outer Space Treaty implementation assessment system, and directly affect the qualifications of enterprises to participate in the cooperation of the International Space Station and deep space exploration projects.

The International Astronautical Federation (IAF) meets in Paris in September 2023. As an international authoritative organization with members of 73 national space agencies, the IAF has systematically proposed a "carbon neutral launch" technology roadmap, requiring launch vehicle manufacturers to increase the proportion of renewable propellants such as biomethane and green liquid hydrogen to more than 40% before 2030, and set a rating standard for the full life cycle carbon emission intensity: Low-earth orbit launches must emit no more than 120 kilograms of carbon per kilogram of payload (the average for conventional kerosene fuels is 380 kilograms), and geosynchronous orbit missions must be limited to 200 kilograms.

== See also ==
- Commercialization of space
  - Space-based economy
    - Space trade
    - Space manufacturing
    - Lunar resources
    - Asteroid mining
    - Ore resources on Mars
- Space industry per country
  - Space industry of Russia
  - Space industry of India
  - Aerospace industry in the United Kingdom
  - Commercial Spaceflight Federation (US)
- Space law
  - Outer Space Treaty
