= NewSpace India Limited =

Public Sector Enterprise of Indian space agency

- Type: Public Sector Undertaking
- Industry: Aerospace; Communications
- Founded: 6 March 2019; 7 years ago
- Headquarters: ISRO HQ, New BEL Road, Bengaluru, Karnataka, India
- Key people: Arunachalam A (Director, Technical & Strategy) Radhakrishna A (Director, Finance)
- Services: Transponder provisioning; Satellite launch; Spacecraft and Subsystems; Mission Support; Ground Infrastructure for Space based Needs
- Owner: Department of Space (DoS)
- Website: nsilindia.co.in

NewSpace India Limited (NSIL) is a Public Sector Undertaking (PSU) of the Government of India, under the Department of Space (DoS). NSIL is responsible for producing, assembling and integrating the launch vehicle with the help of industry consortium. It was established on 6 March 2019 under the administrative control of the DoS and the Companies Act 2013. The main objective of NSIL is to scale up private sector participation in Indian space programmes.

IN-SPACe, ISRO and NSIL at 9th Bengaluru Space Expo 2026, BIEC

== Objectives ==
NSIL was set up with the following objectives:

- Transfer of Small Satellite technology to industry: NSIL will obtain license from DoS/ISRO and sub-license the same to industry
- Manufacture of Small Satellite Launch Vehicle (SSLV) in collaboration with private sector
- Production of Polar Satellite Launch Vehicle (PSLV) through Indian industry
- Production and marketing of Space-based products and services, including launch and application
- Transfer of technology developed by ISRO Centres and constituent units of DoS
- Marketing of spin-off technologies and products/services, both in India and abroad

== Contracts ==
In 2022, NSIL executed a contract with OneWeb to launch 36 satellites to low Earth orbit for their satellite internet constellation. NSIL again successfully deployed another set of 36 OneWeb satellites on 26 March 2023.

The Ministry of Defence signed a ₹3,000-crore agreement with NSIL, a subsidiary of ISRO, for the procurement of the advanced communication satellite, GSAT 7B, to meet the requirements of the Indian Army.

An agreement was reached between NSIL and Arianespace for a long-term collaboration to enable satellite launch missions. As part of the Memorandum of Understanding, Ariane 6 of Arianespace and the medium-lift launch vehicle LVM3 of ISRO will answer the demand for launching larger communication or earth observation satellites as well as satellites for mega constellations, thereby satisfying the needs of the global launch service market.

A launch service agreement has been signed by Space Machines Company and NSIL on 26 June 2024 for the launch of second Optimus spacecraft aboard the SSLV in 2026. The mission will tackle the issue of space debris piling up around Earth, which poses a threat to astronaut safety as well as upcoming space missions. The mission is a component of the International Space Investment India Projects program and is supported by the Australian Space Agency with grant of $8.5 million. Following the inauguration of a new NSIL facility in GIFT city, Gujarat, NSIL signed a contract with GalaxEye in February 2026 towards reselling under lincence satellite data and solutions.

== See also ==
- Space industry of India
  - ISRO
  - Antrix Corporation
