= Microsat-R =

India earth-observing satellite

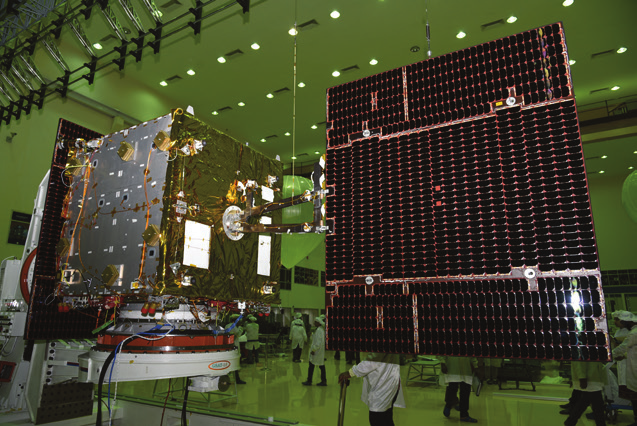
- Microsat-R in satellite preparation facility.
- Mission type: ASAT target (supposedly Earth Observation)
- Operator: DRDO (India)
- COSPAR ID: 2019-006A
- SATCAT no.: 43947

Spacecraft properties
- Manufacturer: DRDO
- Launch mass: 740 kilograms (1,630 lb)

Start of mission
- Launch date: 24 January 2019
- Rocket: PSLV-C44
- Launch site: Satish Dhawan Space Centre (Sriharikota)
- Contractor: Indian Space Research Organization

End of mission
- Disposal: Destroyed in Orbit by ASAT
- Destroyed: 27 March 2019

Orbital parameters
- Reference system: Geocentric
- Regime: SSO at 274 km altitude

Microsat-R was claimed to be an experimental imaging satellite manufactured by DRDO and launched by Indian Space Research Organisation on 24 January 2019 for military use. The satellite served as a target for an anti-satellite test on 27 March 2019.

== Launch ==
Microsat-R, along with KalamsatV2 as piggy-back, was launched on 24 January 2019 at 23:37 hrs from First Launch Pad of Satish Dhawan Space Centre. The launch marks the 46th flight of PSLV. After 13 minutes 26 seconds in flight, Microsat-R was injected at targeted altitude of about 277.2 km. This was the first flight of a new variant of PSLV called PSLV-DL with two strap-ons, each carrying 12.2-tonne of solid propellant.

== Anti-satellite test ==
Microsat-R served as target for Indian ASAT experiment on 27 March 2019. The impact generated more than 400 pieces of orbital debris with 24 having apogee higher than ISS orbit. According to initial assessment by DRDO some of the debris (depending on size and trajectory) should re-enter in 45 days. A spokesperson from NASA disagreed, saying the debris could last for years because the solar minimum had contracted the atmosphere that would otherwise cause the debris to reenter. Analysis from a leading space trajectory and environment simulation company AGI has also come to same conclusion that few debris fragments will take more than a year to come down and other debris fragments might pose a risk to other satellites and ISS and these results were also presented in the 35th Space Symposium at Colorado Springs.

As of March 2022, only one catalogued piece of debris from Microsat-R remained in orbit: COSPAR 2019-006DE, SATCAT 44383. This final piece decayed from orbit 14 June 2022.

== See also ==
- Microsat (ISRO)
- Kosmos 149
- Kosmos 320
- SLATS
