= S139 Booster =

S139
- Manufacturer: Satish Dhawan Space Centre
- Country of origin: India
- Used on: GSLV and PSLV

General characteristics
- Height: 20m-PSLV; 20.2m-GSLV
- Diameter: 2.8m
- Propellant mass: 138,200 kg 138.2 metric tonnes
- Empty mass: 30,200 kg (66,600 lb).

Launch history
- Status: Active
- First flight: Sep 20, 1993

S139
- Maximum thrust: 4,846.9 kN (1,089,600 lbf)
- Specific impulse: 237 s (2.32 km/s) (sea level); 269 s (2.64 km/s) (vacuum)
- Burn time: 110 seconds (PSLV); 100 seconds (GSLV)
- Propellant: HTPB

The S139 (S for Solid, 139 for weight of 139 tonnes) is a Solid Rocket Booster manufactured by the Indian Space Research Organisation at the Satish Dhawan Space Centre in the SPROB facility. The rocket motor was first developed for use in the Polar Satellite Launch Vehicle. Later it was utilised in the GSLV MKII. It uses hydroxyl-terminated polybutadiene (HTPB) as a propellant. It has a maximum thrust of 4800 kN.

== Associated rockets ==
The S139 Booster has been used in 2 major ISRO rockets.

It is used in the PSLV as its core stage since 1993.

It is also used as a core stage in Geosynchronous Satellite Launch Vehicle MKII rocket.

It is also the part of a variant of the Unified Launch Vehicle which is under development.

== Gallery ==
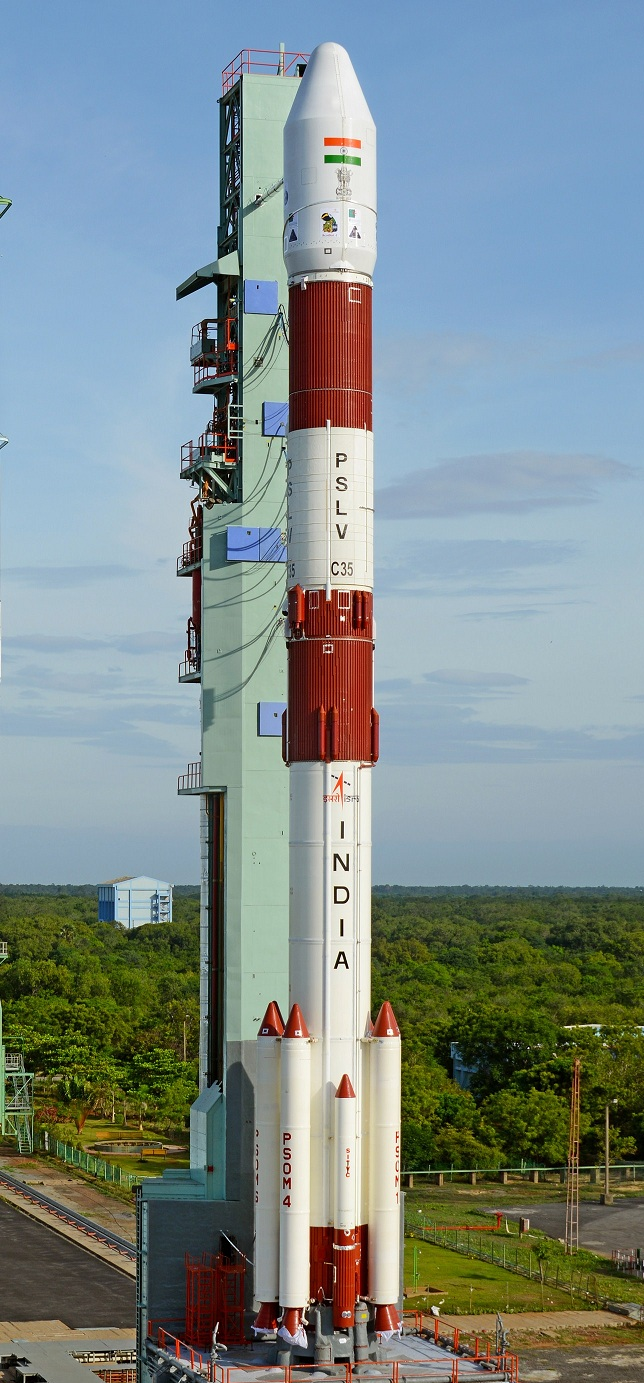
The Core stage of the PSLV is the S139 Booster

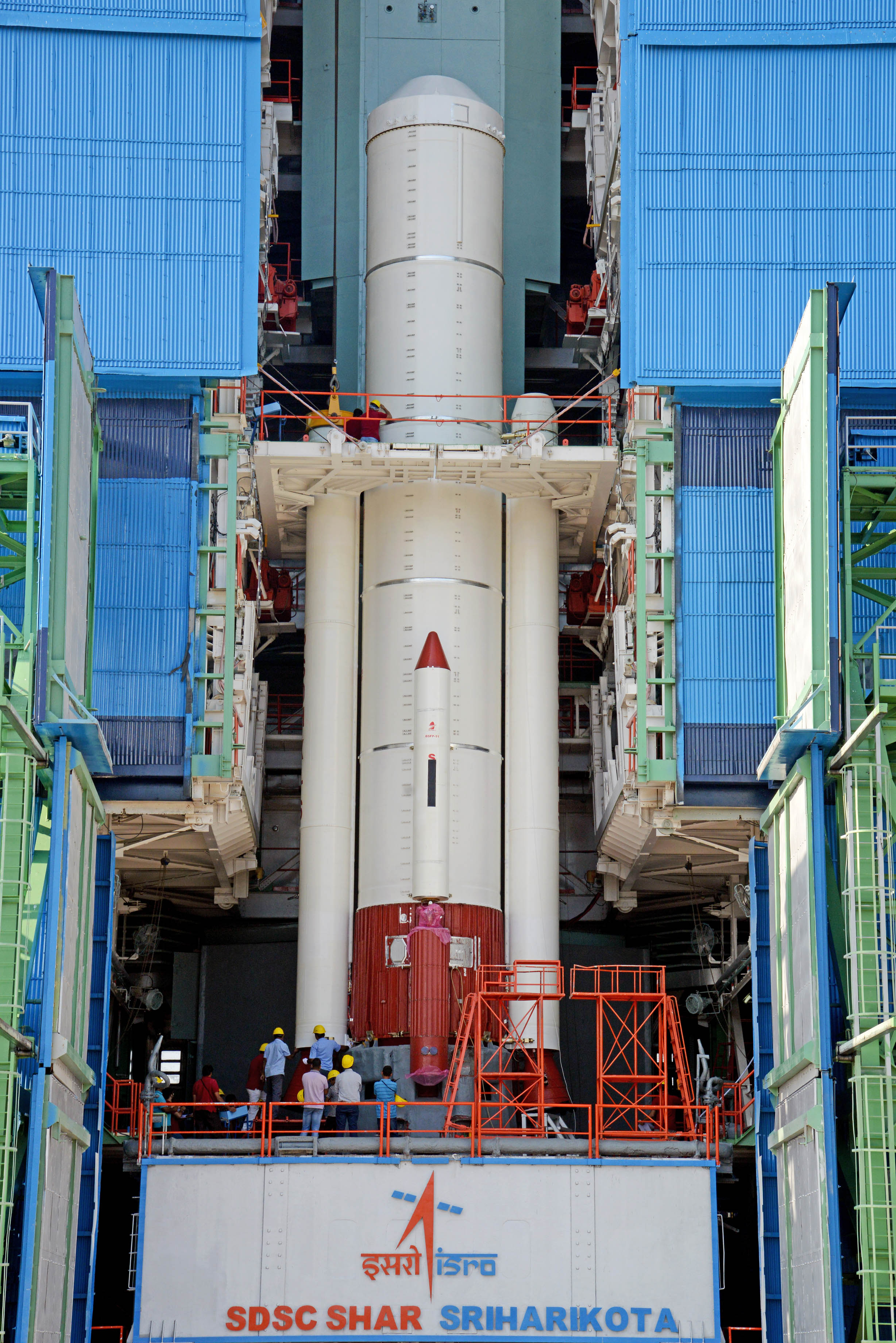
The PS-1 stage with two S12 Solid Rocket Boosters being Integrated with the S139 core stage

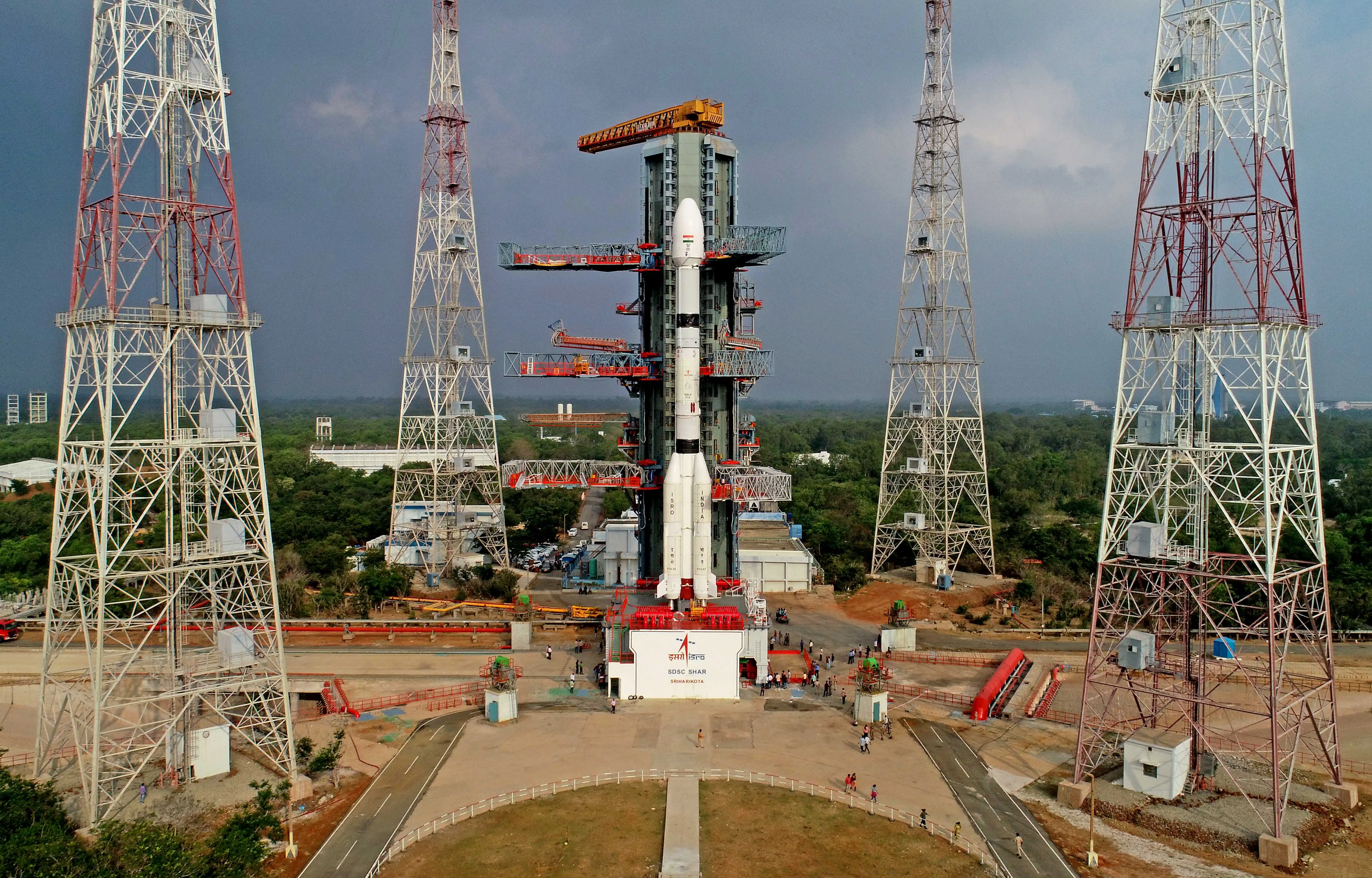
The GSLV-mk.ii also uses the S139 booster as its core stage

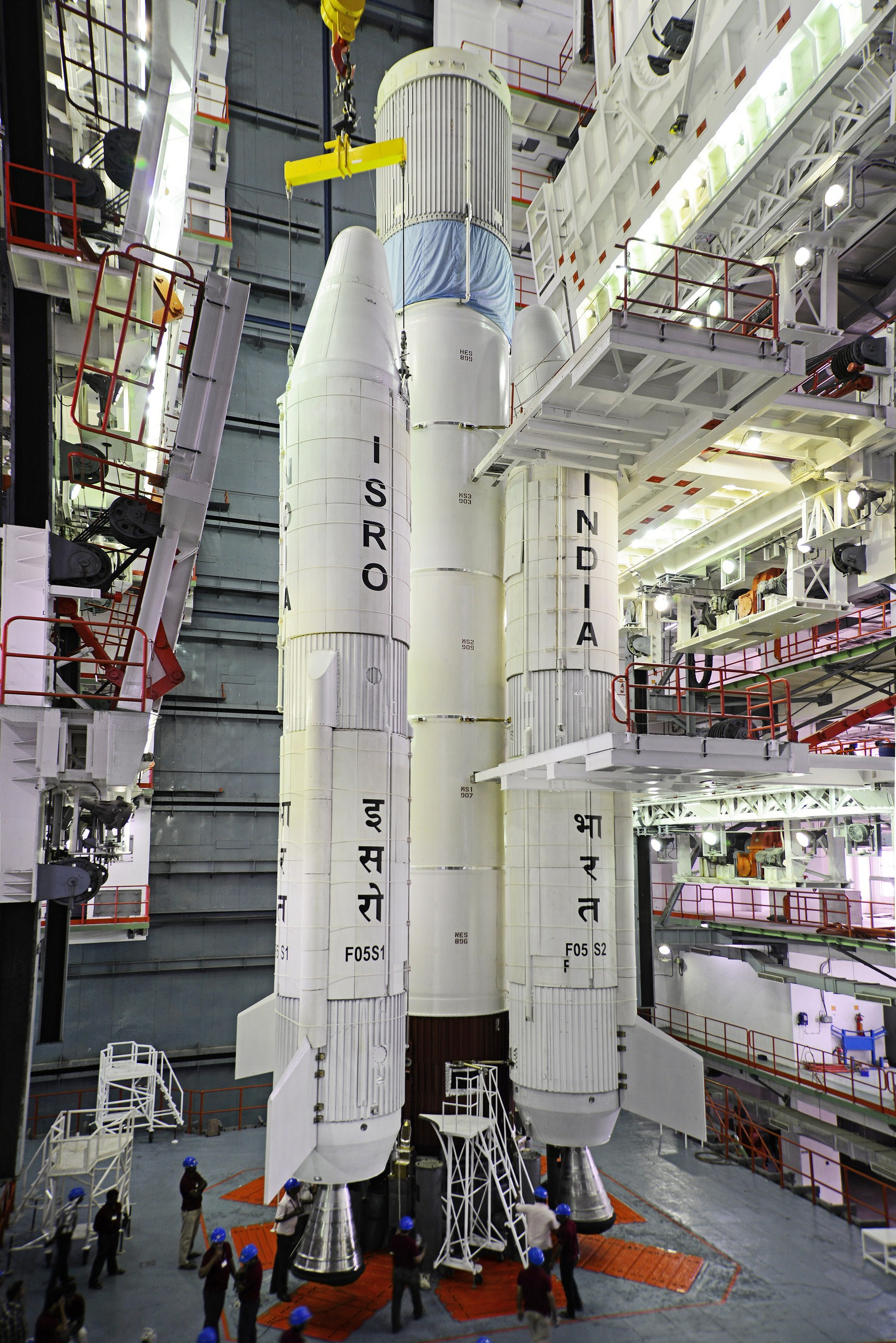
The L40 boosters being integrated with the S139 stage on a GSLV-mk ii
