= PSLV-C44 =

46th mission of the Indian Polar Satellite Launch Vehicle (PSLV) program

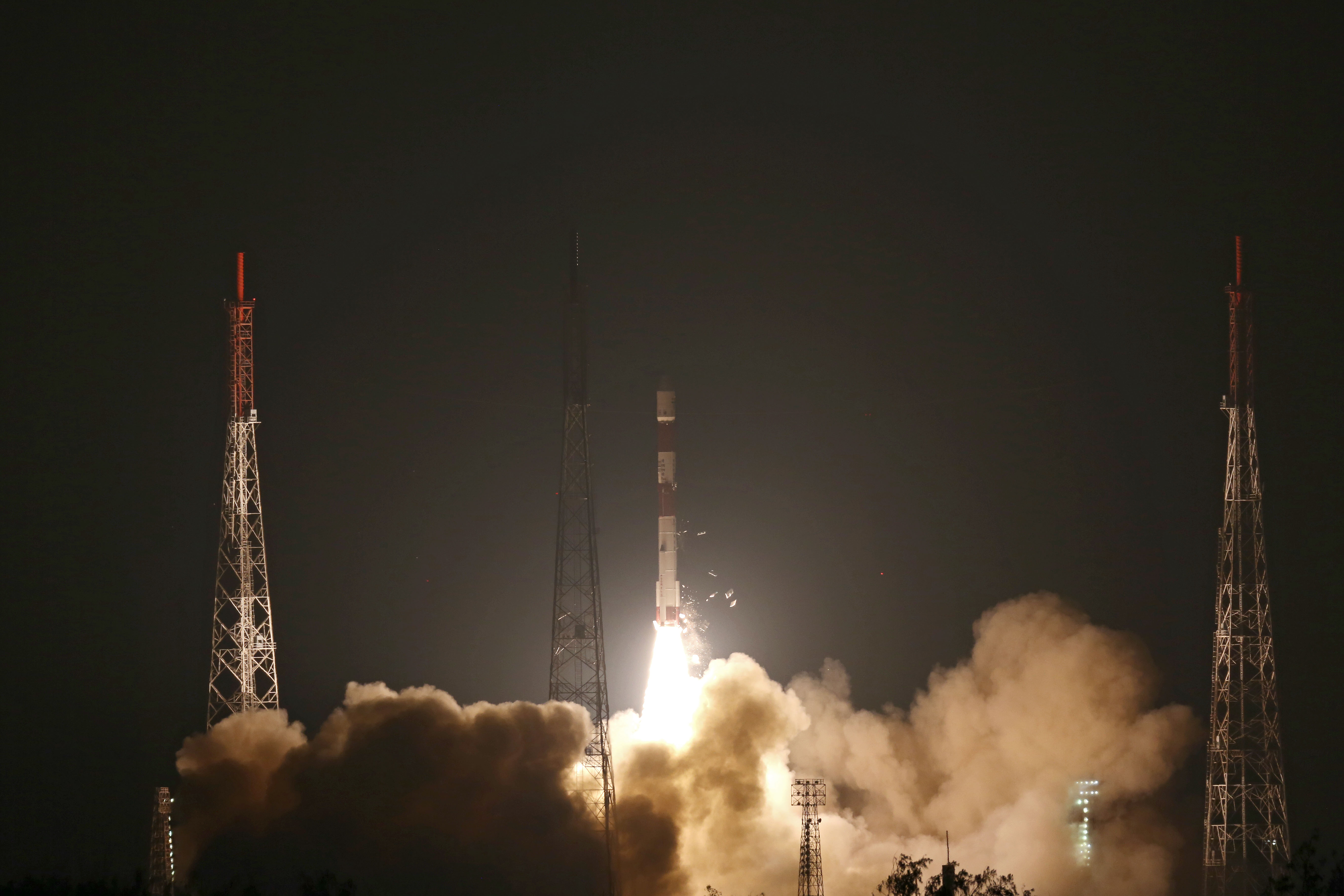
- Liftoff of the PSLV-DL launch vehicle during flight C44

PSLV-DL launch
- Launch: 24 January 2019, 18:07:00 UTC
- Operator: Indian Space Research Organisation (ISRO)
- Pad: Sriharikota, FLP
- Payload: Kalamsat-V2; Microsat-R
- Outcome: Success

PSLV launches

The PSLV-C44 was the 46th mission of the Indian Polar Satellite Launch Vehicle (PSLV) program. It was the first flight of PSLV-DL, having 2 strap-on boosters and placed a primary payload Microsat-R and a secondary payload of Kalamsat V2 in Sun-synchronous orbits.

== PSLV-C44 launch ==
The PSLV-C44 was launched from the First Launch Pad (FLP) of the Satish Dhawan Space Centre in Sriharikota at 11:37:00 P.M. IST on 24 January 2019, following a 28-hour countdown that began at 07:37 P.M. IST on 23 January 2019.

== Mission overview ==
- Mass:
  - Payload weight: 741.2 kg (1,634 lb)
- Overall height: 44.4 m (146 ft)
- Propellant:
  - Stage 1: Composite Solid
  - Stage 2: Earth Storable Liquid
  - Stage 3: Composite Solid
  - Stage 4: Earth Storable Liquid
- Propellant mass:
  - Stage 1: 139,000 kg (306,000 lb)
  - Stage 2: 41,000 kg (90,000 lb)
  - Stage 3: 7,650 kg (16,870 lb)
  - Stage 4: 1,600 kg (3,500 lb)
- Altitude: 450 km (280 mi)
- Maximum velocity: 7,740 m/s (25,400 ft/s) (recorded at time of Kalamsat separation)
- Inclination: 96.567°
- Azimuth: 140°
- Period:

The PSLV C-44 rocket had four stages; each one was self-contained, with its own propulsion system, thereby capable of functioning independently. The first and third stages used composite solid propellants, while the second and fourth stage used earth-storable liquid propellants. It had a lift-off mass of 230,400 kg (507,900 lb) and measured 44.4 m (146 ft) in height. It carried two satellites built by Defence Research and Development Organisation (DRDO) and Space Kidz India into orbit, weighing 740 kg (1,630 lb) and 1.2 kg (2.6 lb) respectively, bringing the total payload mass to 741.2 kg (1,634 lb).

The satellite Microsat-R was placed into a lower Sun-synchronous orbit of 274.12 km (170.33 mi) altitude and 96.575° inclination, meanwhile, the second satellite was placed with an experimental 4th stage into an orbit of 450 km (280 mi) altitude and 98.767°. The satellite was launched free of cost and was placed into the orbit after 2 subsequent rocket burn past Microsat-R release. It would later be destroyed in the Indian ASAT test (Mission Shakti) on 27th March 2019.
