= Kosmos 320 =

Soviet orientation control test satellite

- Mission type: Technology
- Operator: VNIIEM
- COSPAR ID: 1970-005A
- SATCAT no.: 04301

Spacecraft properties
- Spacecraft type: DS-MO
- Manufacturer: Yuzhnoye
- Launch mass: 375 kilograms (827 lb)

Start of mission
- Launch date: 16 January 1970, 10:59:58 UTC
- Rocket: Kosmos-2I 63SM
- Launch site: Kapustin Yar 86/4

End of mission
- Decay date: 10 February 1970

Orbital parameters
- Reference system: Geocentric
- Regime: Low Earth
- Perigee altitude: 247 kilometres (153 mi)
- Apogee altitude: 326 kilometres (203 mi)
- Inclination: 48.4 degrees
- Period: 90.2 minutes

Kosmos 320 (Russian: Космос 320 meaning Cosmos 320), also known as DS-MO No.3 was a technology demonstration satellite which was launched by the Soviet Union in 1970 as part of the Dnepropetrovsk Sputnik programme. Its primary mission was to demonstrate orientation control by means of an aerodynamic skirt stabiliser. It also carried an optical research payload for the Soviet Armed Forces.

== Launch ==
It was launched aboard a Kosmos-2I 63SM rocket from Site 86/4 at Kapustin Yar. The launch occurred at 10:59:58 UTC on 16 January 1970.

== Orbit ==
Kosmos 320 was placed into a low Earth orbit with a perigee of 247 kilometres (153 mi), an apogee of 326 kilometres (203 mi), 48.4 degrees of inclination, and an orbital period of 90.2 minutes. It decayed from orbit on 10 February 1970. Kosmos 320 was the second of two DS-MO satellites to be launched. It was preceded by Kosmos 149, which was launched in March 1967.
