= Polar Satellite Launch Vehicle =

Indian expendable launch vehicle

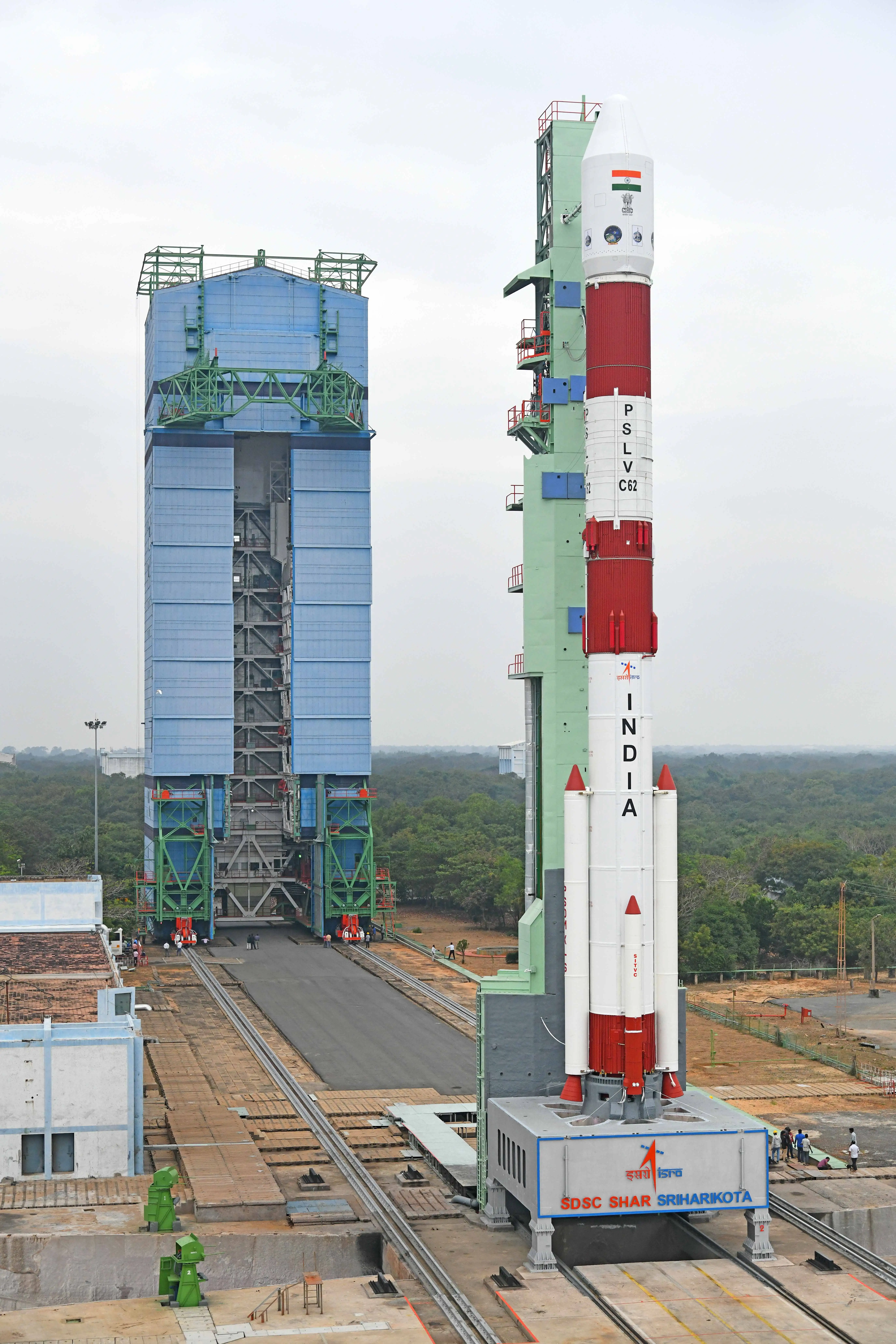
- PSLV C-62 mission prior to launch
- Function: Medium-lift launch system
- Manufacturer: ISRO
- Country of origin: India
- Cost per launch: ₹130 crore (equivalent to ₹167 crore or US$18 million in 2026) -₹200 crore (equivalent to ₹257 crore or US$27 million in 2026)

Size
- Height: 44 m (144 ft)
- Diameter: 2.8 m (9 ft 2 in)
- Mass: PSLV-G: 295,000 kg (650,000 lb); PSLV-CA: 230,000 kg (510,000 lb); PSLV-XL: 320,000 kg (710,000 lb)
- Stages: 4

Capacity

Payload to LEO (200 km @ 30° inclination)
- Mass: G: 3,200 kg (7,100 lb); CA: 2,100 kg (4,600 lb); XL: 3,800 kg (8,400 lb)

Payload to SSO (620 km circular)
- Mass: G: 1,600 kg (3,500 lb); CA: 1,100 kg (2,400 lb); XL: 1,750 kg (3,860 lb)

Payload to Sub-GTO (284 × 20650 km)
- Mass: 1,425 kg (3,142 lb) (PSLV-XL)

Payload to GTO
- Mass: G: 1,150 kg (2,540 lb); XL: 1,300 kg (2,900 lb)

Payload to Venus
- Mass: 107 kg (236 lb) to 766 kg (1,689 lb) (direct transfer)

Payload to Mars
- Mass: 150 kg (330 lb) to 770 kg (1,700 lb) (direct transfer)

Associated rockets
- Comparable: Vega, Nuri

Launch history
- Status: Active
- Launch sites: Satish Dhawan Space Centre
- Total launches: 64
- Success(es): 59
- Failure: 4
- Partial failure: 1
- First flight: PSLV-G: 20 September 1993; PSLV-CA: 23 April 2007; PSLV-XL: 22 October 2008; PSLV-DL: 24 January 2019; PSLV-QL: 1 April 2019
- Last flight: PSLV-G: 26 September 2016; PSLV-CA: 30 December 2024; PSLV-XL: 18 May 2025; PSLV-DL: 12 January 2026; PSLV-QL: 11 December 2019
- Carries passengers or cargo: Chandrayaan-1; Mars Orbiter Mission; AstroSat; SRE-1; NavIC; Aditya-L1; PROBA-3

Boosters (PSLV-G) – S9
- No. boosters: 6
- Maximum thrust: 510 kN (110,000 lb_{f})
- Specific impulse: 262 s (2.57 km/s)
- Burn time: 44 s
- Propellant: HTPB

Boosters (PSLV-XL/QL/DL) – S12
- No. boosters: 6 (XL); 4 (QL); 2 (DL)
- Height: 12 m (39 ft)
- Diameter: 1 m (3 ft 3 in)
- Propellant mass: 12,200 kg (26,900 lb) each
- Powered by: off
- Maximum thrust: 703.5 kN (158,200 lb_{f})
- Total thrust: 4,221 kN (949,000 lb_{f}) (XL); 2,814 kN (633,000 lb_{f}) (QL); 1,407 kN (316,000 lb_{f}) (DL)
- Specific impulse: 262 s (2.57 km/s)
- Burn time: 70 s
- Propellant: HTPB

First stage
- Height: 20 m (66 ft)
- Diameter: 2.8 m (9 ft 2 in)
- Propellant mass: 138,200 kg (304,700 lb) each
- Powered by: 1 S139
- Maximum thrust: 4,846.9 kN (1,089,600 lb_{f})
- Specific impulse: 237 s (2.32 km/s) (sea level); 269 s (2.64 km/s) (vacuum)
- Burn time: 110 s
- Propellant: HTPB

Second stage
- Height: 12.8 m (42 ft)
- Diameter: 2.8 m (9 ft 2 in)
- Propellant mass: 42,000 kg (93,000 lb) each
- Powered by: 1 Vikas-2B
- Maximum thrust: 803.7 kN (180,700 lb_{f})
- Specific impulse: 293 s (2.87 km/s)
- Burn time: 151 s
- Propellant: N_{2}O_{4}/UDMH

Third stage
- Height: 3.6 m (12 ft)
- Diameter: 2 m (6 ft 7 in)
- Propellant mass: 7,600 kg (16,800 lb) each
- Powered by: 1 S-7
- Maximum thrust: 250 kN (56,000 lb_{f})
- Specific impulse: 295 s (2.89 km/s)
- Burn time: 126.7 s
- Propellant: HTPB

Fourth stage
- Height: 3 m (9.8 ft)
- Diameter: 1.3 m (4 ft 3 in)
- Propellant mass: 2,500 kg (5,500 lb) each
- Powered by: 2 L-2-5
- Maximum thrust: 14.66 kN (3,300 lb_{f})
- Specific impulse: 308 s (3.02 km/s)
- Burn time: 525 s
- Propellant: MMH/MON

The Polar Satellite Launch Vehicle (PSLV) is an expendable medium-lift launch vehicle designed and operated by ISRO. It was developed to allow India to launch its Indian Remote Sensing (IRS) satellites into Sun-synchronous orbits, a service that was, until the advent of the PSLV in 1993, only commercially available from Russia. PSLV can also launch small size satellites into Geostationary Transfer Orbit (GTO).

Some notable payloads launched by PSLV include India's first lunar probe Chandrayaan-1, India's first interplanetary mission, Mars Orbiter Mission (Mangalyaan), India's first space observatory, Astrosat and India's first Solar mission, Aditya-L1.

PSLV has gained credibility as a leading provider of rideshare services for small satellites, owing to its numerous multi-satellite deployment campaigns with auxiliary payloads, usually ride-sharing along with an Indian primary payload. As of December 2024, PSLV has launched 360 foreign satellites from 36 countries and European Union. Most notable among these was the launch of PSLV-C37 on 15 February 2017, successfully deploying 104 satellites in Sun-synchronous orbit, tripling the previous record held by Russia for the highest number of satellites sent to space on a single launch, until 24 January 2021, when SpaceX launched the Transporter-1 mission on a Falcon 9 rocket carrying 143 satellites into orbit.

Payloads can be integrated in tandem configuration employing a Dual Launch Adapter. Smaller payloads are also placed on equipment deck and customized payload adapters.

== Development ==
Studies by the PSLV Planning group under S Srinivasan to develop a vehicle capable of delivering a 600 kg payload to a 550 km sun-synchronous orbit from SHAR began in 1978. Among 35 proposed configurations, four were picked; by November 1980, a vehicle configuration with two strap-ons on a core booster (S80) with 80 tonne solid propellant loading each, a liquid stage with 30 tonne propellant load (L30), and an upper stage called the Perigee-Apogee System (PAS) was being considered.

By 1981, confidence grew in remote sensing spacecraft development with the launch of Bhaskara-1, and the PSLV project objectives were upgraded to have the vehicle deliver a 1000 kg payload into a 900 km SSO. As technology transfer of Viking rocket engine firmed up, a new lighter configuration with the inclusion of a liquid powered stage was selected. Funding was approved in July 1982 for the finalized design, employing a single large S125 solid core as first stage with six 9 tonne strap-ons (S9) derived from the SLV-3 first stage, liquid fueled second stage (L33), and two solid upper stages (S7 and S2.) This configuration needed further improvement to meet the orbital injection accuracy requirements of IRS satellites, and hence, the solid terminal stage (S2) was replaced with a pressure fed liquid fueled stage (L1.8 or LUS) powered by twin engines derived from roll control engines of the first stage. Apart from increasing precision, liquid upper stage also absorbed any deviation in performance of solid third stage. The final configuration of PSLV-D1 to fly in 1993 was (6 × S9 + S125) + L37.5 + S7 + L2.

The inertial navigation systems are developed by ISRO Inertial Systems Unit (IISU) at Thiruvananthapuram. The liquid propulsion for the second and fourth stages of the PSLV as well as the Reaction control systems (RCS) are developed by the Liquid Propulsion Systems Centre (LPSC) at Valiamala near Thiruvananthapuram, kerala. The solid propellant motors are processed at Satish Dhawan Space Centre (SHAR) at Sriharikota, Andhra Pradesh, which also carries out launch operations. The aerodynamic characterization research was conducted at the National Aerospace Laboratories' 1.2m Trisonic Wind Tunnel Facility.

The PSLV was first launched on 20 September 1993. The first and second stages performed as expected, but an attitude control problem led to the collision of the second and third stages at separation, and the payload failed to reach orbit. After this initial setback, the PSLV successfully completed its second mission in 1994. The fourth launch of PSLV suffered a partial failure in 1997, leaving its payload in a lower than planned orbit. In November 2014, the PSLV had launched 34 times with no further failures. (Although launch 41: August 2017 PSLV-C39 was unsuccessful.)

PSLV continues to support Indian and foreign satellite launches especially for low Earth orbit (LEO) satellites. It has undergone several improvements with each subsequent version, especially those involving thrust, efficiency as well as weight. In November 2013, it was used to launch the Mars Orbiter Mission, India's first interplanetary probe.

In June 2018, the Union Cabinet approved ₹6,131 crore (equivalent to ₹79 billion or US$840 million in 2026) for 30 operational flights of the PSLV scheduled to take place between 2019 and 2024.

ISRO is working towards handing over the production and operation of PSLV to private industry through a joint venture. On 16 August 2019, NewSpace India Limited issued an invitation to tender for manufacturing PSLV entirely by private industries. On 5 September 2022, NewSpace India Limited signed a contract with Hindustan Aeronautics Limited and Larsen & Toubro led conglomerate for the production of five PSLV-XL launch vehicles after they won competitive bidding. Under this contract, they have to deliver their first PSLV-XL within 24 months and the remaining four vehicles every six months.

== Vehicle description ==
The PSLV has four stages, using solid and liquid propulsion systems alternately.

=== First stage (PS1) ===
The first stage, one of the largest solid rocket boosters in the world, carries 138 t (136 long tons; 152 short tons) of hydroxyl-terminated polybutadiene-bound (HTPB) propellant and develops a maximum thrust of about 4,800 kN (1,100,000 lb_{f}). The 2.8 m (9 ft 2 in) diameter motor case is made of maraging steel and has an empty mass of 30,200 kg (66,600 lb).

Pitch and yaw control during first stage flight is provided by the Secondary Injection Thrust Vector Control (SITVC) System, which injects an aqueous solution of strontium perchlorate into the S139 exhaust divergent from a ring of 24 injection ports to produce asymmetric thrust. The solution is stored in two cylindrical aluminium tanks strapped to the core solid rocket motor and pressurised with nitrogen. Underneath these two SITVC tanks, Roll Control Thruster (RCT) modules with small bi-propellant (MMH/MON) liquid engine are also attached. The SITVC system was first developed by ISRO for SLV-3 and was also used on the ASLV.

On the PSLV-G and PSLV-XL, first stage thrust is augmented by six strap-on solid boosters. Four boosters are ground-lit and the remaining two ignite 25 seconds after launch. The solid boosters carry 9 t (8.9 long tons; 9.9 short tons) or 12 t (12 long tons; 13 short tons) (for PSLV-XL configuration) propellant and produce 510 kN (110,000 lb_{f}) and 719 kN (162,000 lb_{f}) thrust respectively. Two strap-on boosters are also equipped with SITVC for additional attitude control. The PSLV-CA uses no strap-on boosters.First stage separation is aided by four pairs of retro-rockets installed on inter-stage (1/2L). During staging, these eight rockets help push away the spent stage away from second stage. ISRO also develed the SOLVE booster using PSOM boosters for testing the Gaganyaan programme.

=== Second stage (PS2) ===
The second stage is powered by a single Vikas engine and carries 41.5 t (40.8 long tons; 45.7 short tons) of Earth store-able liquid propellant – unsymmetrical dimethylhydrazine (UDMH) as fuel and nitrogen tetroxide (N_{2}O_{4}) as oxidiser in two tanks separated by a common bulkhead. It generates a maximum thrust of 800 kN (180,000 lb_{f}). The engine is gimbaled (±4°) in two planes to provide pitch and yaw control by two actuators, while roll control is provided by a Hot gas Reaction Control Motor (HRCM) that ejects hot gases diverted from gas generator of Vikas engine.

On inter-stage (1/2U) of PS2, there are two pairs of ullage rockets to maintain positive acceleration during PS1/PS2 staging and also two pairs of retro-rockets to help push away spent stage during PS2/PS3 staging.

Second stage also carries water in a toroidal tank at its bottom. Water spray is used to cool hot gases from Vikas' gas generator to about 600 °C before entering turbopump. Propellant and water tanks of second stage are pressurized by Helium.

=== Third stage (PS3) ===
The third stage uses 7.6 t (7.5 long tons; 8.4 short tons) of HTPB solid propellant and produces a maximum thrust of 250 kN (56,000 lb_{f}). Its burn duration is 126.7 seconds. It has a Kevlar-polyamide fibre case and a submerged nozzle equipped with a flex-bearing-seal gimbaled nozzle with ±2° thrust vector for pitch and yaw control. Roll control is provided by the fourth stage reaction control system (RCS) during thrust phase as well as during combined-coasting phase under which burnt-out PS3 remains attached to PS4. Following stage failure on two flights (PSLV-C61 & PSLV-C62), An upgraded stage was designed by ISRO and test fired on 12th November, with essential changes made to the nozzle flex design, and additional evaluation on assembly procedures, raw materials and pre-flight checks being implemented into the stage. Furter tests are also planned to verify the stage before it's next flight.

=== Fourth stage (PS4) ===
The fourth stage is powered by regeneratively cooled twin engines, burning monomethylhydrazine (MMH) and mixed oxides of nitrogen (MON). Each pressure fed engine generates 7.4 kN (1,700 lb_{f}) thrust and is gimbaled (±3°) to provide pitch, yaw and roll control during powered flight. Coast phase attitude control is provided by six 50N RCS thrusters. The stage is pressurized by helium and carries 1,600 kg (3,500 lb) to 2,500 kg (5,500 lb) of propellant depending on the mission requirements. PS4 has three variants L1.6, L2.0 and L2.5 based on propellant tank capacity.

On PSLV-C29/TeLEOS-1 mission, the fourth stage demonstrated re-ignition capability for the first time which was used in many subsequent flights to deploy payloads in multiple orbits on a single campaign.

As a space debris mitigation measure, PSLV fourth stage gets passivated by venting pressurant and propellant vapour after achieving main mission objectives. Such passivation prevents any unintentional fragmentation or explosion due to stored internal energy.

The niobium alloy nozzle used on twin engines of fourth stage is expected to be replaced by lighter, silicon carbide coated carbon–carbon nozzle divergent. The new nozzle was hot tested at facilities of IPRC, Mahendragiri in March and April 2024. This substitution should increase payload capacity of PSLV by 15 kilograms (33 lb). ISRO also replaced imported Columbium materials in the engine nozzle divergent with Stellite, which resulted in cost savings of 90%. The newly modified engines were tested at IPRC in April 2025.

ISRO successfully completed 665-second hot test of 3D printed PS4 engine, produced by Wipro 3D through selective laser melting. A total of 19 weld joints were eliminated through this process while engine's 14 components were reduced to one piece. It saved 60% of the production time and drastically decreased the amount of raw materials used per engine, from 565 kg to 13.7 kg of metal powder.

==== PS4 stage as orbital platform ====
PS4 has carried hosted payloads like AAM on PSLV-C8, Rubin 9.1/Rubin 9.2 on PSLV-C14 and mRESINS on PSLV-C21. But now, PS4 is being augmented to serve as a long duration orbital platform after completion of primary mission. PS4 Orbital Platform (PS4-OP) will have its own power supply, telemetry package, data storage and attitude control for hosted payloads.

On PSLV-C37 and PSLV-C38 campaigns, as a demonstration PS4 was kept operational and monitored for over ten orbits after delivering spacecraft.

PSLV-C44 was the first campaign where PS4 functioned as independent orbital platform for short duration as there was no on-board power generation capacity. It carried KalamSAT-V2 as a fixed payload, a 1U CubeSat by Space Kidz India based on Interorbital Systems kit.

On PSLV-C45 campaign, the fourth stage had its own power generation capability as it was augmented with an array of fixed solar cells around PS4 propellant tank. The three payloads hosted on PS4-OP were the Advanced Retarding Potential Analyzer for Ionospheric Studies (ARIS 101F) by IIST, an experimental AIS payload by ISRO, and AISAT by Satellize. To function as orbital platform, fourth stage was put in spin-stabilized mode using its RCS thrusters.

On the PSLV-C53 campaign, the PS4-OP is referred to as the PSLV Orbital Experimental Module (POEM), and it hosted six payloads. POEM was the first PSLV fourth stage based orbital platform to be actively stabilised using Helium based cold gas thrusters after the primary mission and stage passivization.

==== PS4 on RLV-OREX ====
The Reusable Launch Vehicle Technology Demonstration program is a prototype spaceplane project currently being processed by ISRO. It is planned to use a GSLV, modified by replacing its Cryogenic Upper Stage(CUS) with the PS-4 as the RLV would not required the excess thrust created by the CUS.

=== Payload fairing ===
Payload fairing of PSLV, also referred as its "Heatshield" consists of a conical upper section with spherical nose-cap, a cylindrical middle section and a lower boat-tail section. Weighing 1,182 kilograms (2,606 lb), it has 3.2 meter diameter and 8.3 meter height. It has Isogrid construction and is made out of 7075 aluminum alloy with a 3 mm thick steel nose-cap. The two halves of fairing are separated using a pyrotechnic device based jettisoning system consisting of horizontal and lateral separation mechanisms. To protect the spacecraft from damage due to excessive acoustic loads during launch, the heatshield interior is lined with acoustic blankets.

	Stage 1	Stage 2	Stage 3	Stage 4
Pitch	SITVC	Engine Gimbal	Nozzle Flex	Engine Gimbal
Yaw	SITVC	Engine Gimbal	Nozzle Flex	Engine Gimbal
Roll	RCT and SITVC in 2 PSOMs	HRCM Hot Gas Reaction Control Motor	PS4 RCS	PS4 RCS

=== Integration gallery ===
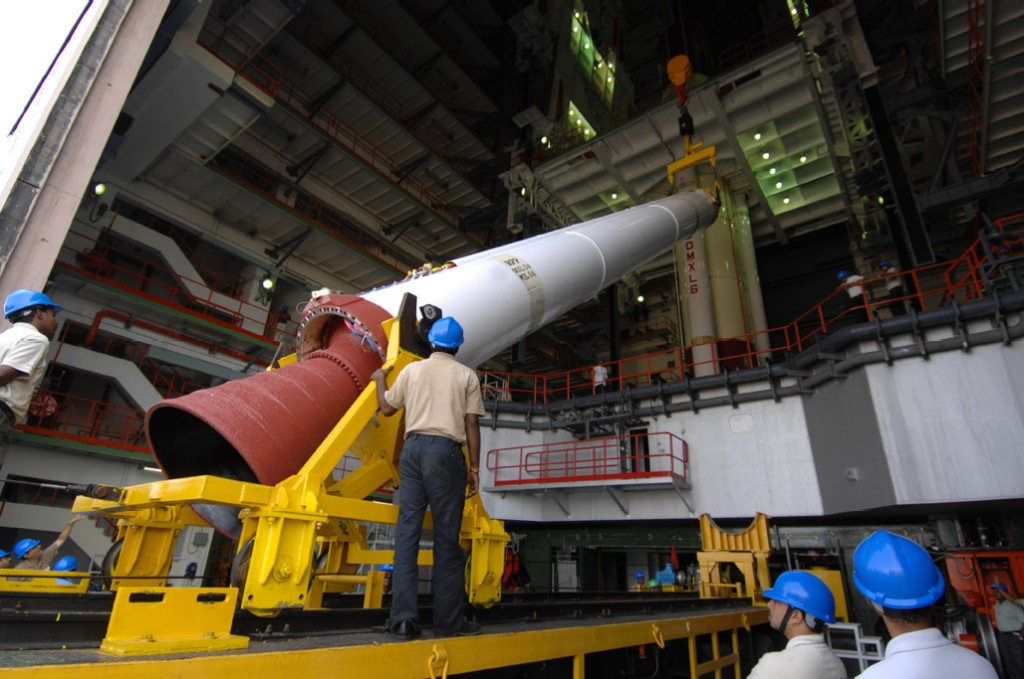
PSLV-C11 strap-on

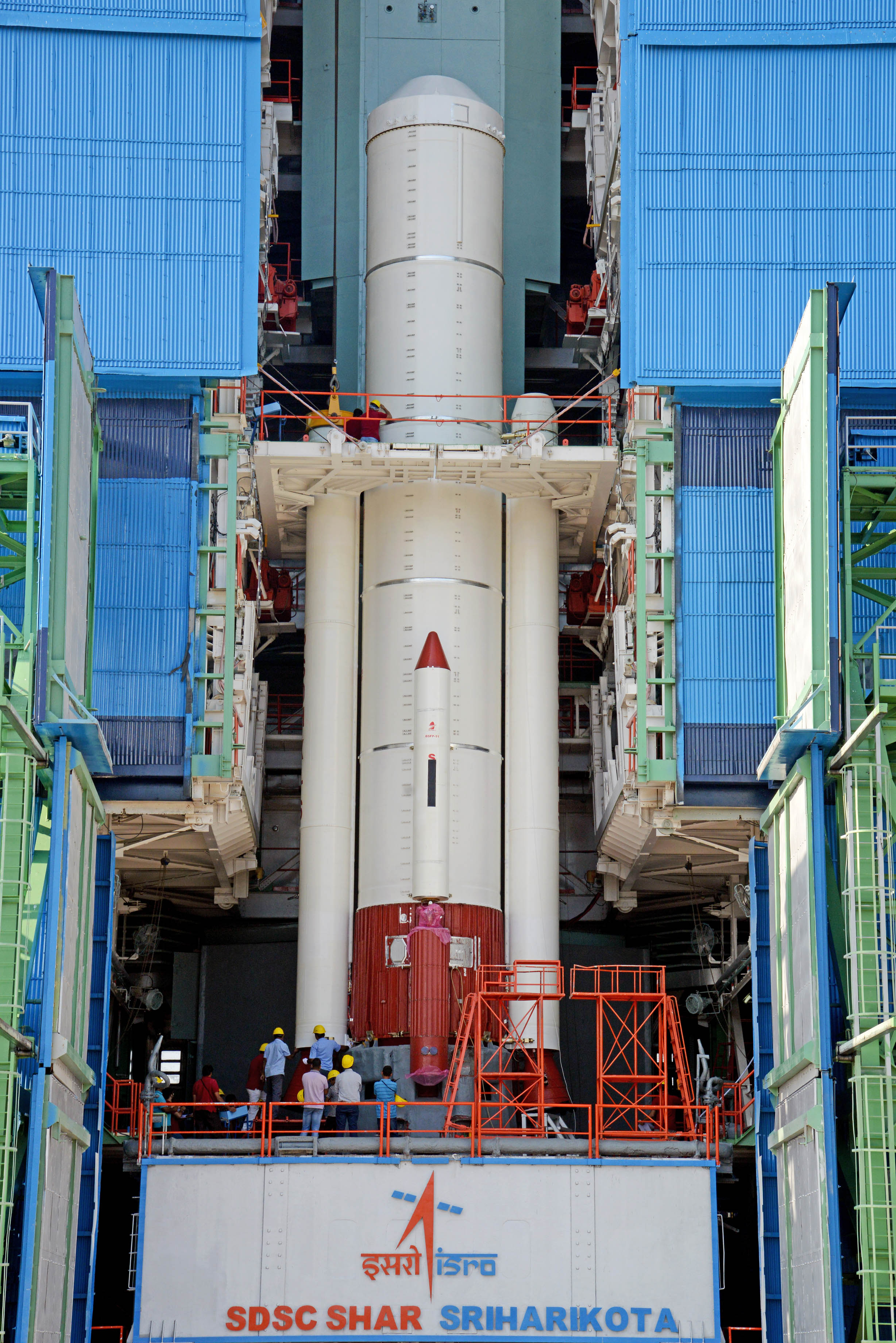
PSLV-C44 first stage inside Mobile Service Tower

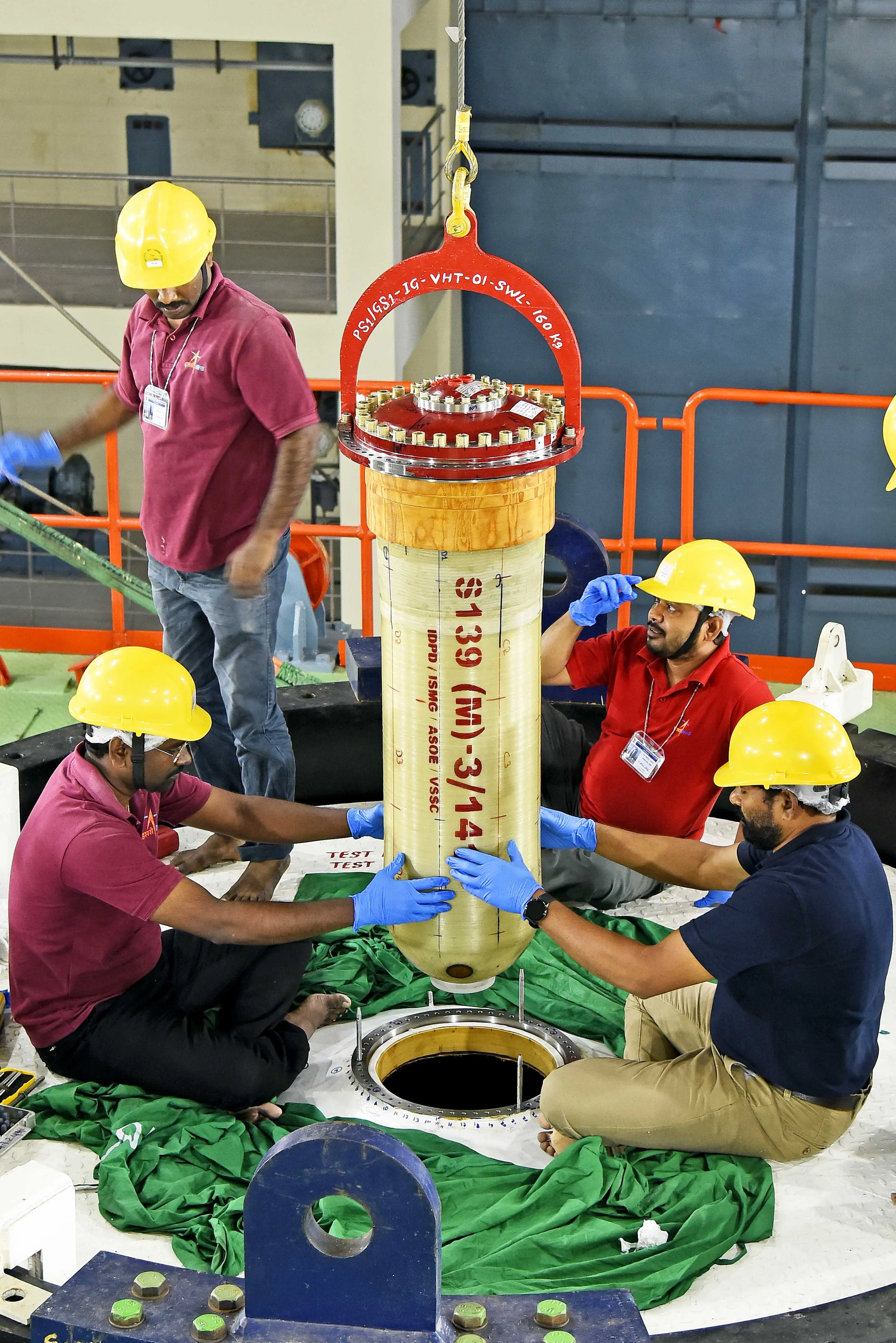
First stage Igniter being integrated onto the rocket

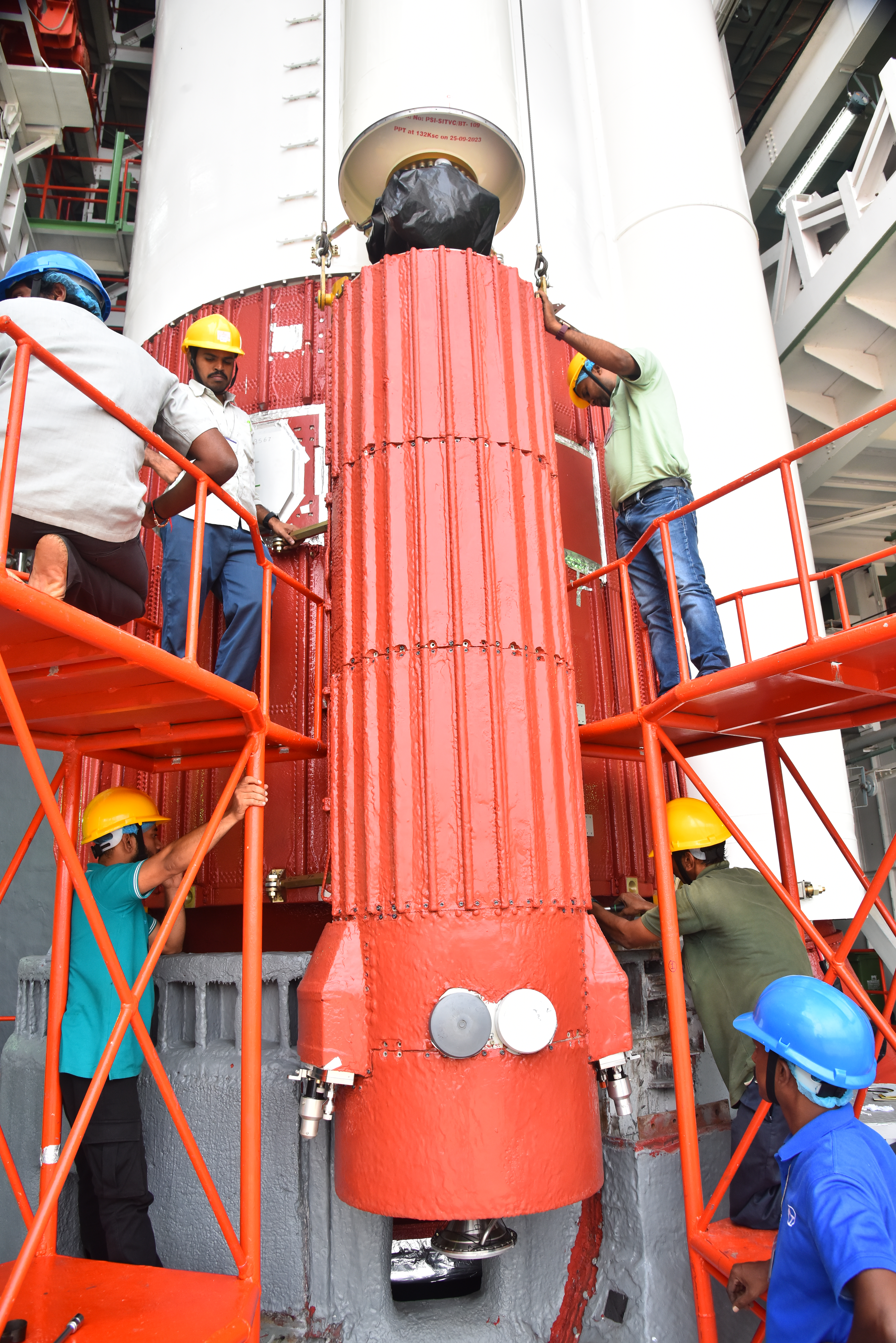
PSLV Ullage motors

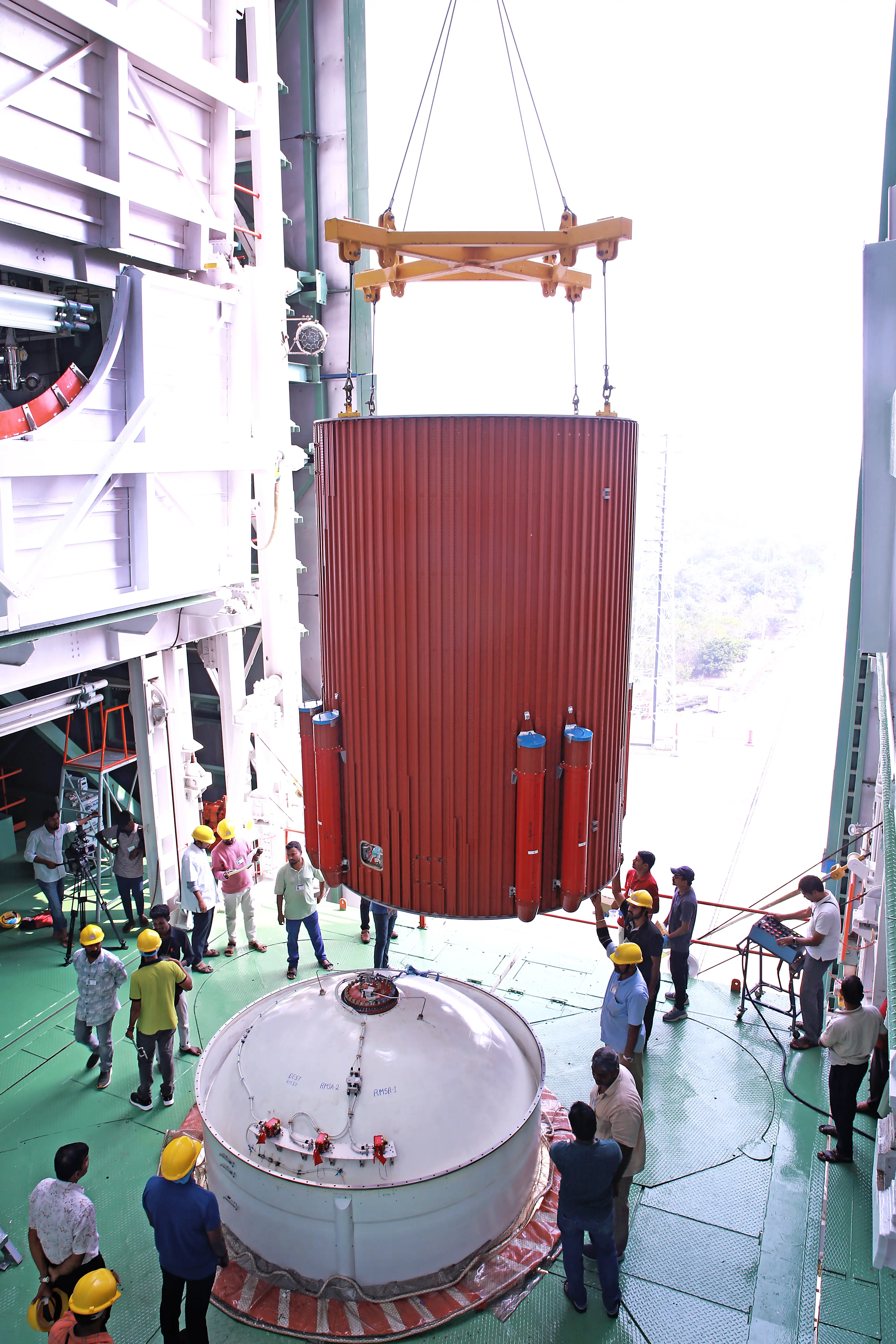
PSLV First-Second interstage

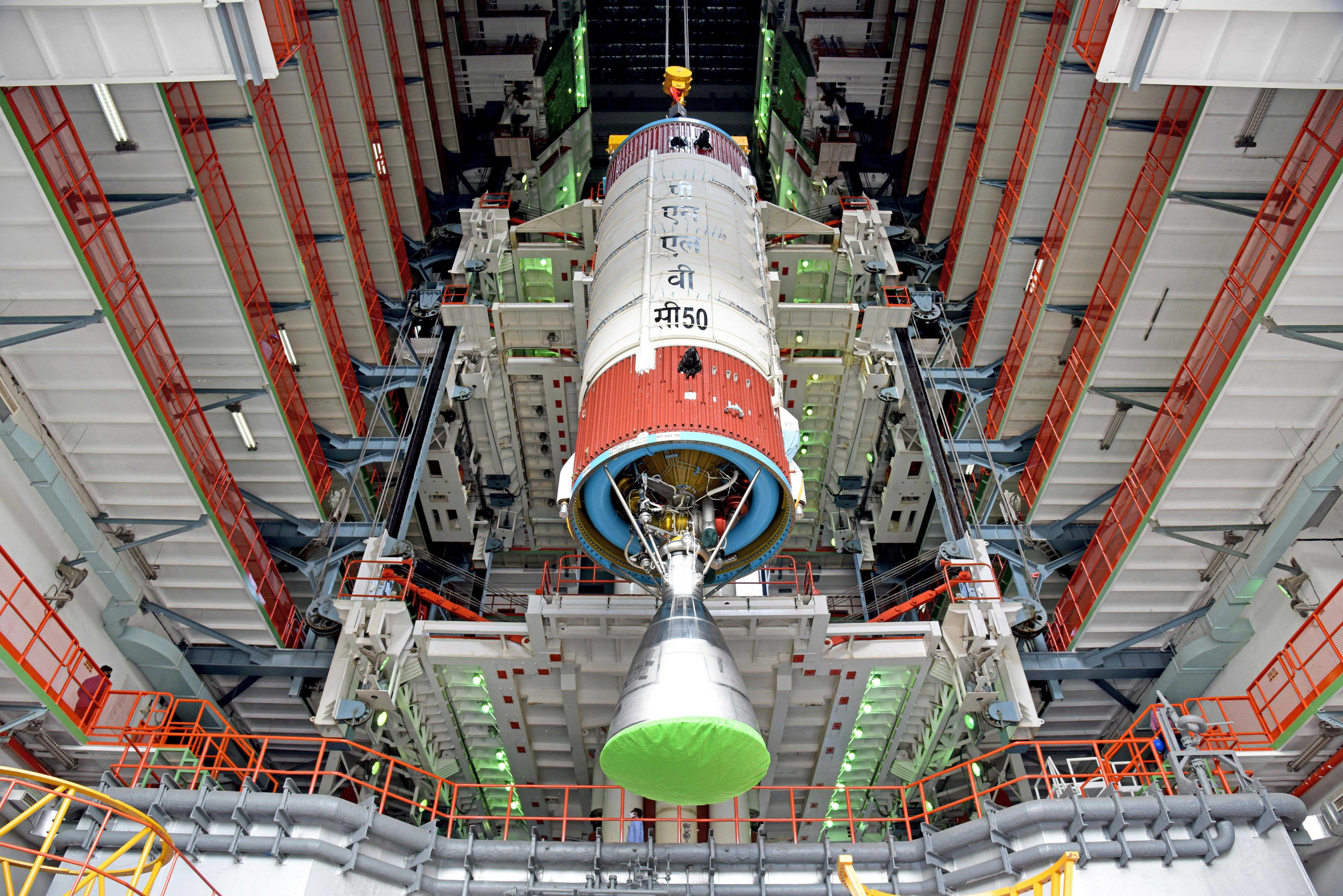
Vikas engine and second stage

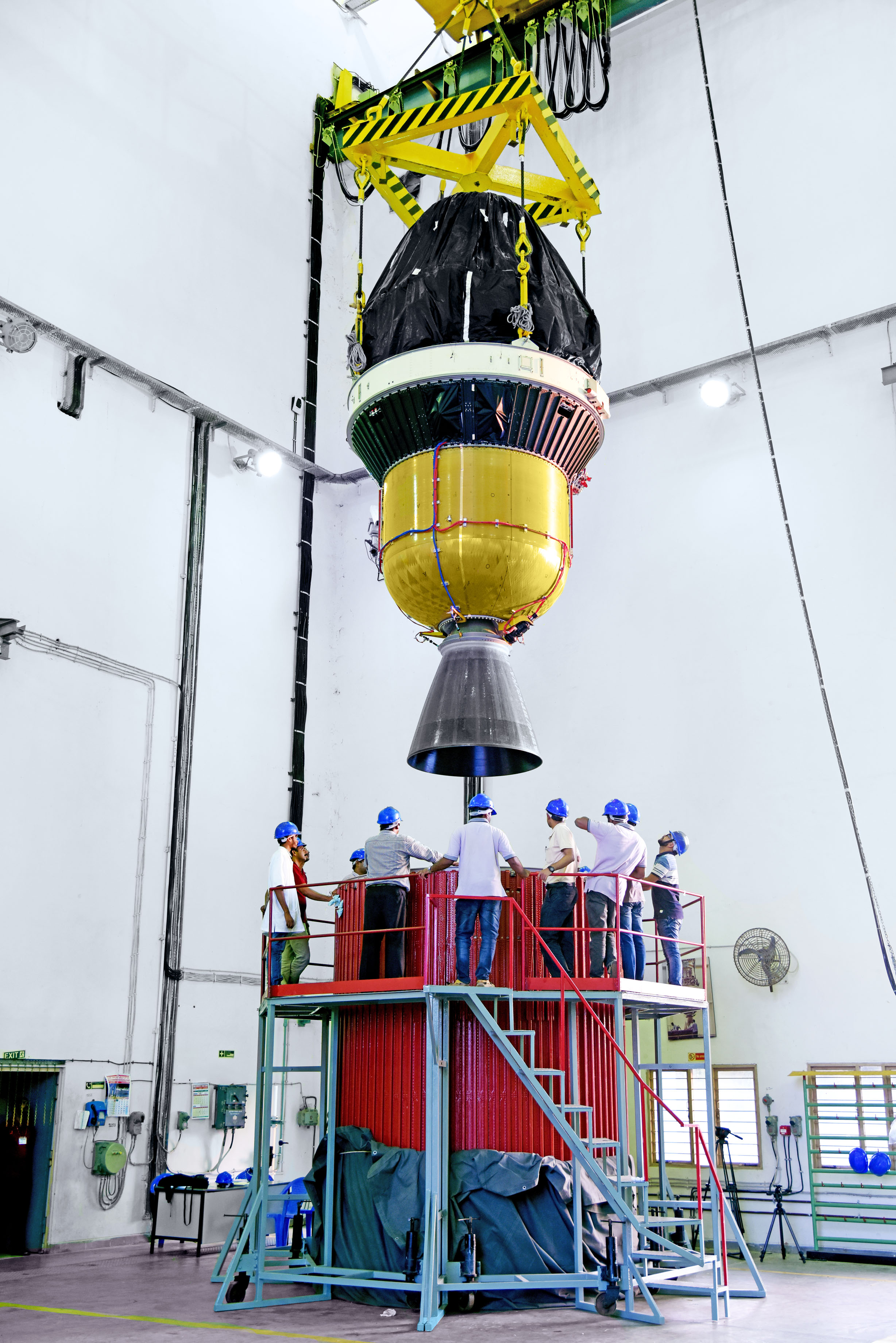
Third and fourth stages of PSLV-C45

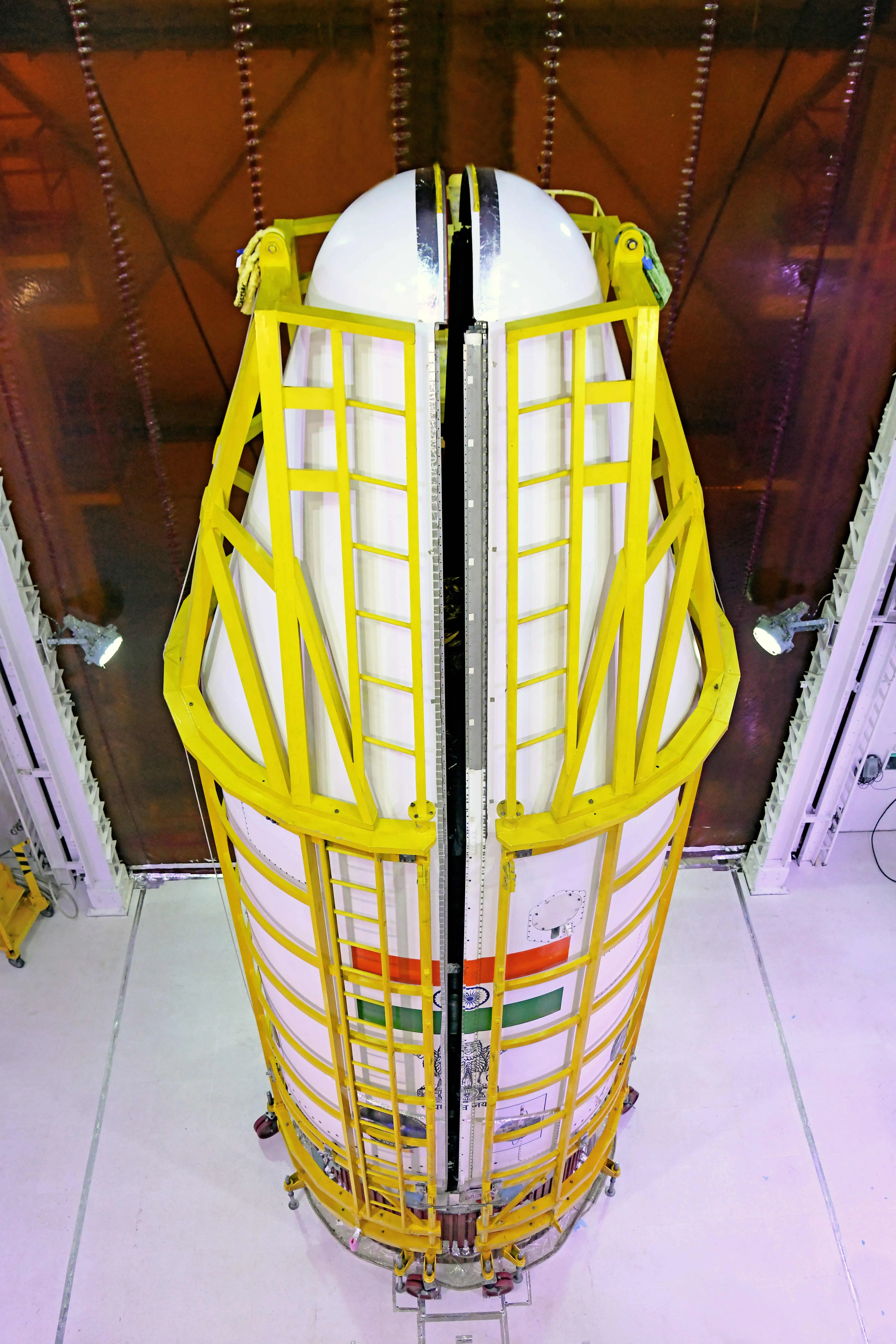
Payload fairing integration

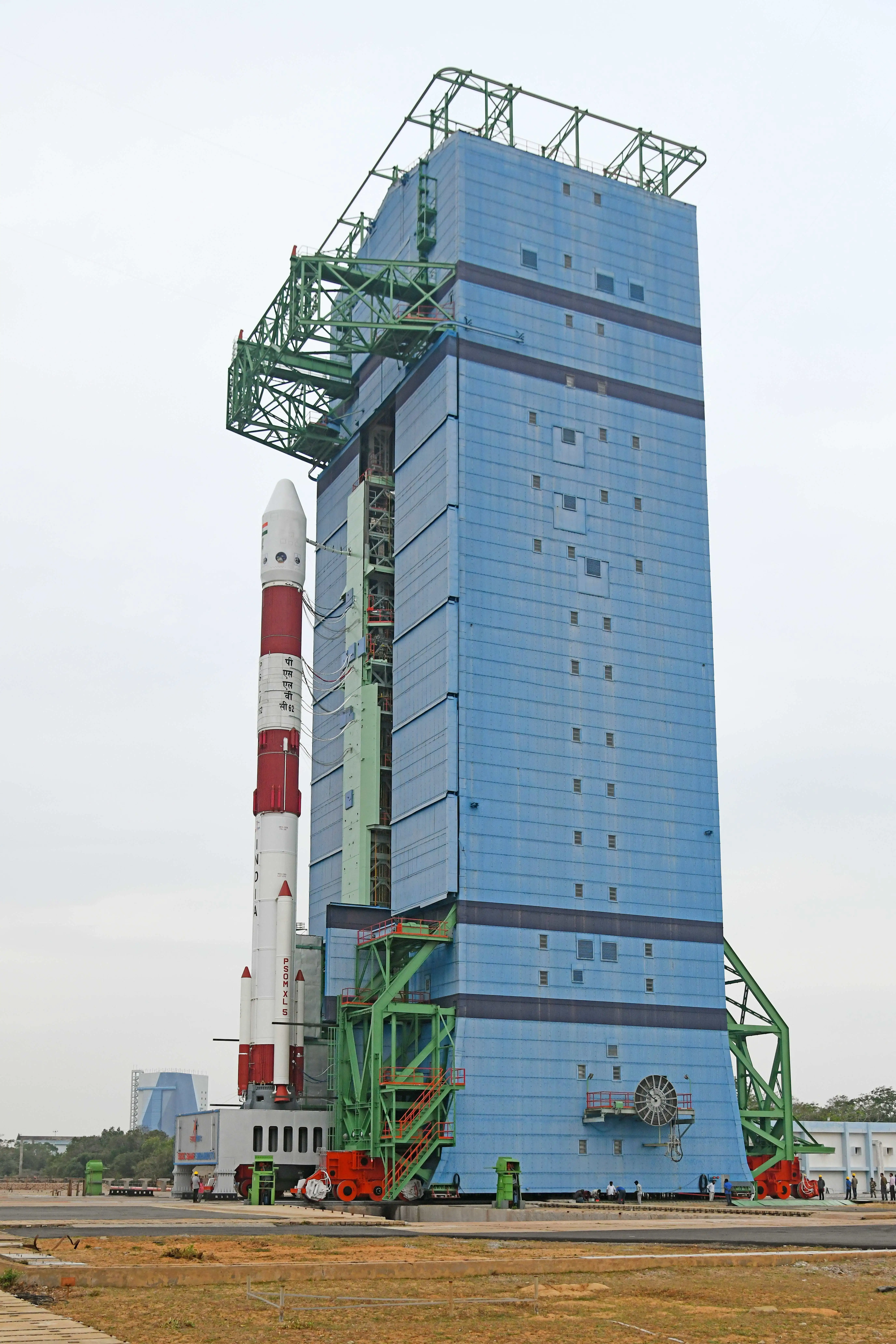
Rollout prior to launch

== Variants ==
ISRO has envisaged a number of variants of PSLV to cater to different mission requirements. There are currently two operational versions of the PSLV — the core-alone (PSLV-CA) without strap-on motors, and the (PSLV-XL) version, with six extended length (XL) strap-on motors carrying 12 tonnes of HTPB based propellant each. These configurations provide wide variations in payload capabilities up to 3,800 kg (8,400 lb) in LEO and 1,800 kg (4,000 lb) in sun-synchronous orbit.

=== PSLV-G ===
The standard or "Generic" version of the PSLV, PSLV-G had four stages using solid and liquid propulsion systems alternately and six strap-on motors (PSOM or S9) with 9 tonne propellant loading. It had the capability to launch 1,678 kg (3,699 lb) to 622 km (386 mi) into sun-synchronous orbit. PSLV-C35 was the last operational launch of PSLV-G before its discontinuation.

=== PSLV-CA ===
The PSLV-CA, CA meaning "Core Alone", model premiered on 23 April 2007. The CA model does not include the six strap-on boosters used by the PSLV standard variant but the two SITVC tanks with Roll Control Thruster modules are still attached to the side of the first stage with addition of two cylindrical aerodynamic stabilizers. The fourth stage of the CA variant has 400 kg (880 lb) less propellant when compared to its standard version. It currently has capability to launch 1,100 kg (2,400 lb) to 622 km (386 mi) Sun-synchronous orbit.

=== PSLV-XL ===
PSLV-XL is the upgraded version of Polar Satellite Launch Vehicle in its standard configuration boosted by more powerful, stretched six strap-on boosters with 12 tonne propellant load. Weighing 320 t (310 long tons; 350 short tons) at lift-off, the vehicle uses larger strap-on motors (PSOM-XL or S12) to achieve higher payload capability. On 29 December 2005, ISRO successfully tested an improved version of the strap-on booster for the PSLV. The first use of PSLV-XL was the launch of Chandrayaan-1 by PSLV-C11. The payload capability for this variant is 1,800 kg (4,000 lb) to Sun-synchronous orbit.

=== PSLV-DL ===
PSLV-DL variant has only two strap-on boosters with 12 tonne propellant load on them. PSLV-C44 on 24 January 2019 was the first flight to use PSLV-DL variant of Polar Satellite Launch Vehicle. It is capable of launching 1,257 kg (2,771 lb) to 600 km (370 mi) Sun-synchronous orbit.

=== PSLV-QL ===
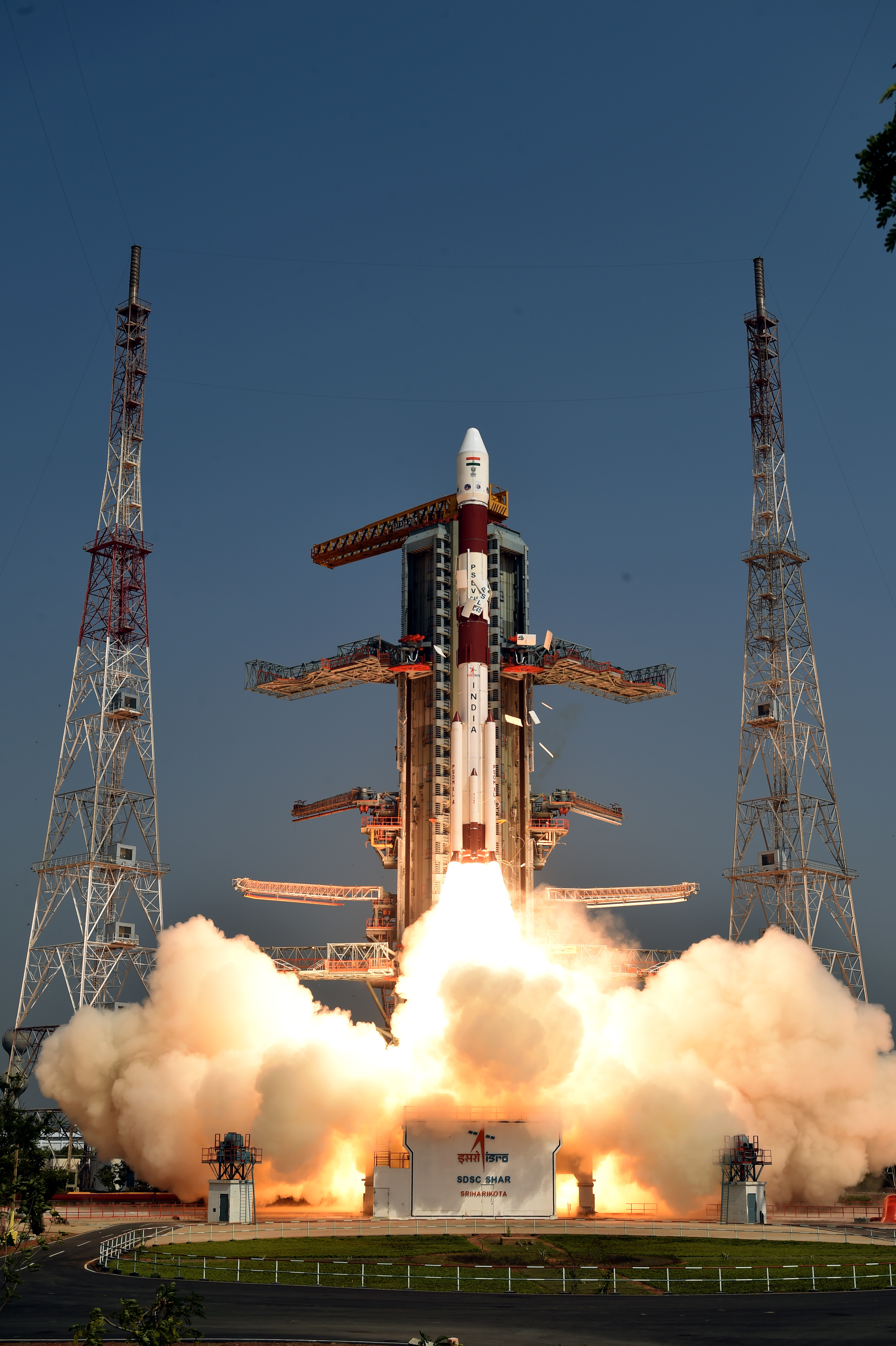
PSLV-C45 lift off

PSLV-QL variant has four ground-lit strap-on boosters, each with 12 tonnes of propellant. PSLV-C45 on 1 April 2019 was the first flight of PSLV-QL. It has the capacity to launch 1,523 kg (3,358 lb) to 600 km (370 mi) Sun-synchronous orbit.

=== PSLV-3S (concept) ===
PSLV-3S was conceived as a three-staged version of PSLV with its six strap-on boosters and second liquid stage removed. The total lift-off mass of PSLV-3S was expected to be 175 tonnes with capacity to place 500 kg in 550 km low Earth orbit.

== Launch profile ==
PSLV - XL:

- The PS1 ignites at T+0 providing 4846 kN of thrust.
- Within T+1, 4 out of the 6 boosters ignite on ground, each producing 703 kN of thrust. 7658 kN of total thrust is produced by the combined propulsion of the PSOMs and the PS1.
- At around T+23/26, the remaining 2 unlit boosters are air-lit bringing the rocket at its maximum thrust capacity.
- At T+1:10, the first 4 ground-lit PSOMs have depleted its propellant and now separates and falls down to the ocean. The remaining 2 PSOMs and the PS1 continue to burn.
- At T+1:35, the remaining 2 PSOMs complete its 70 seconds burn and separate, leaving the rocket in a Core Alone configuration.
- At T+1:50, the PS1 has completed its 110-second burn and it separates and the Vikas Engine inside the PS2 ignites.
- The second stage burns for around 130 seconds and around T+4 minutes, the second stages shuts off and separates.
- The third stage, which is a solid rocket booster, and burns 80 seconds and then coasts for the remainder of time and around T+8/10 minutes, it separates and the 4th stage ignites to give the rocket a final push into the orbit.
- This 4th stage burn is highly variable and depends on the mass and number of payloads and is usually around 500 seconds long. The 4th stage may shut off around T+16/18 minutes followed by the Payload Deployment.

Launch Timeline for PSLV-C57/Aditya-L1 mission
Si.no	Flight Event	Time (seconds)	Local Altitude (km)	Inertial Velocity (m/s)
1	RCT Ignition	-3	0.025	0
2	PS1 Ignition	0	0.025	0
3	PSOM XL 1,2 (GL) Ignition	0.42	0.025	451.9
4	PSOM XL 3,4 (GL) Ignition	0.62	0.025	451.9
5	PSOM XL 5, 6 (AL) Ignition	25	2.725	625.9
6	PSOM XL 1,2 (GL) Separation	69.9	24.196	1479.5
7	PSOM XL 3,4 (GL) Separation	70.1	24.326	1484.5
8	PSOM XL 5,6 (AL) Separation	92.8	40.558	2094.5
9	PS1 Separation	109.4	55.496	2407.3
10	PS2 Ignition	109.6	55.663	2406.8
11	CLG Initiation	114.6	59.745	2435
12	PLF Separation	204.4	113.22	3756.5
13	PS2 Separation	262.4	130.372	5400.7
14	PS3 Ignition	263.6	130.597	5400.3
15	PS3 Separation	581.4	192.868	7728.3
16	PS4 Burn-1 Ignition	1493.5	313.067	7587.5
17	PS4 Burn-1 Cut-off	1523.4	313.07	7677.8
18	PS4 Burn-2 Ignition	3127.5	217.614	7793.6
19	PS4 Burn-2 Cut-off	3599.4	342.65	9695
20	Aditya-L1 Separation	3799.4	648.781	9429.2
21	MON Passivation Start	4042.5	1232.269	8956.9
22	MMH Passivation Start	2382.5	2298.785	8212.3

== Launch statistics ==
As of 12 January 2026, the PSLV has made 63 launches, with 58 successfully reaching their planned orbits, four outright failures and one partial failure, yielding a success rate of 92% (or 94% including the partial failure). All launches have occurred from the Satish Dhawan Space Centre, known before 2002 as the Sriharikota Range (SHAR).

=== Launch system status ===
Retired

Variant	Launches	Successes	Failures	Partial failures
PSLV-G (Standard)	12	10	1	1
PSLV-CA (Core Alone)	17	17	0	0
PSLV-XL (Extended)	27	25	2	0
PSLV-DL	5	4	1	0
PSLV-QL	2	2	0	0
Total as of December 2024	63	58	4	1

=== Decade-wise summary of PSLV launches ===
Decade	Successful	Partial success	Failure	Total
1990s	3	1	1	5
2000s	11	0	0	11
2010s	33	0	1	34
2020s	11	0	2	13
Total	58	1	4	63

== Gallery ==
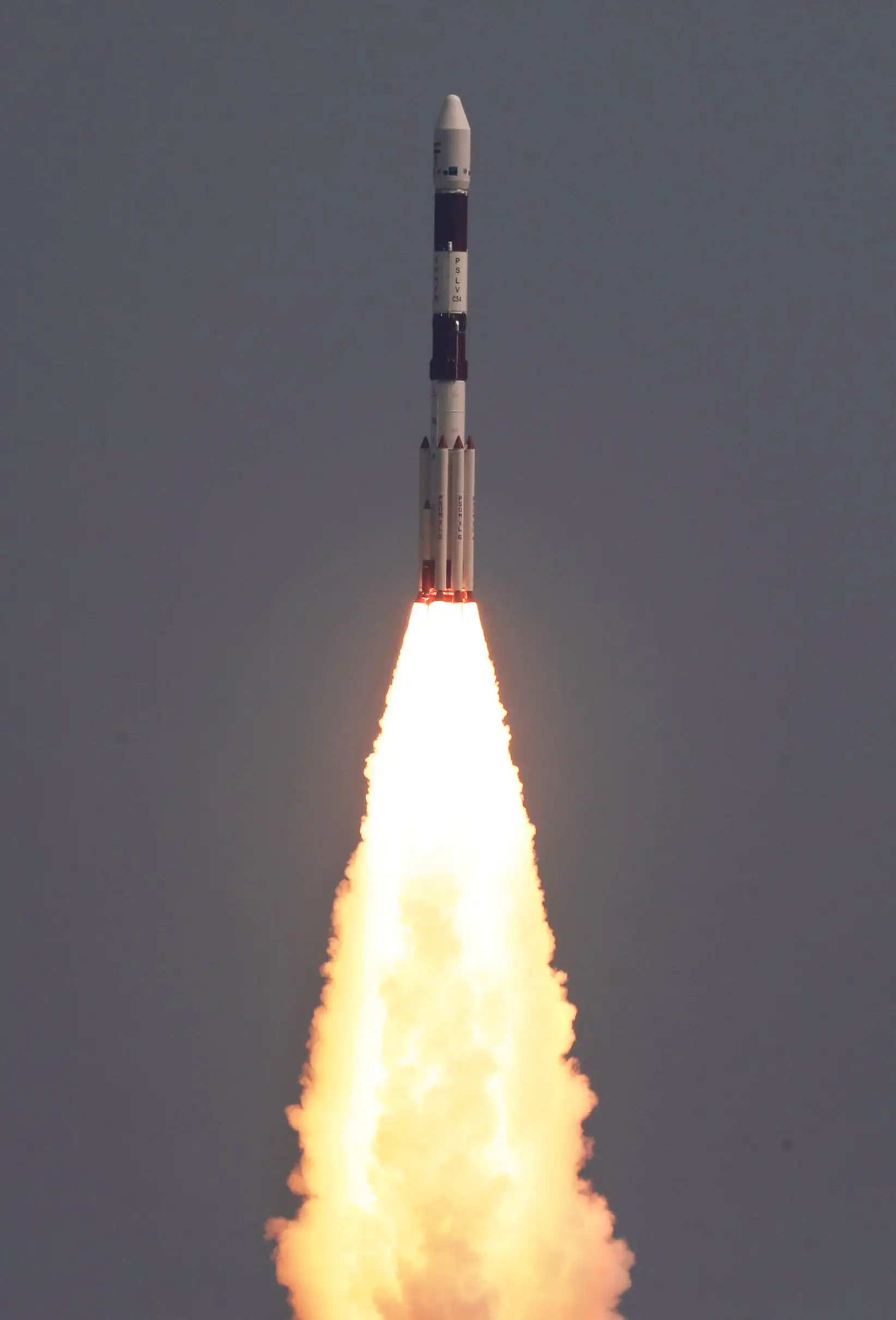
PSLV - C54 Liffed off from Satish Dhawan Space Center's, First Launch Pad.

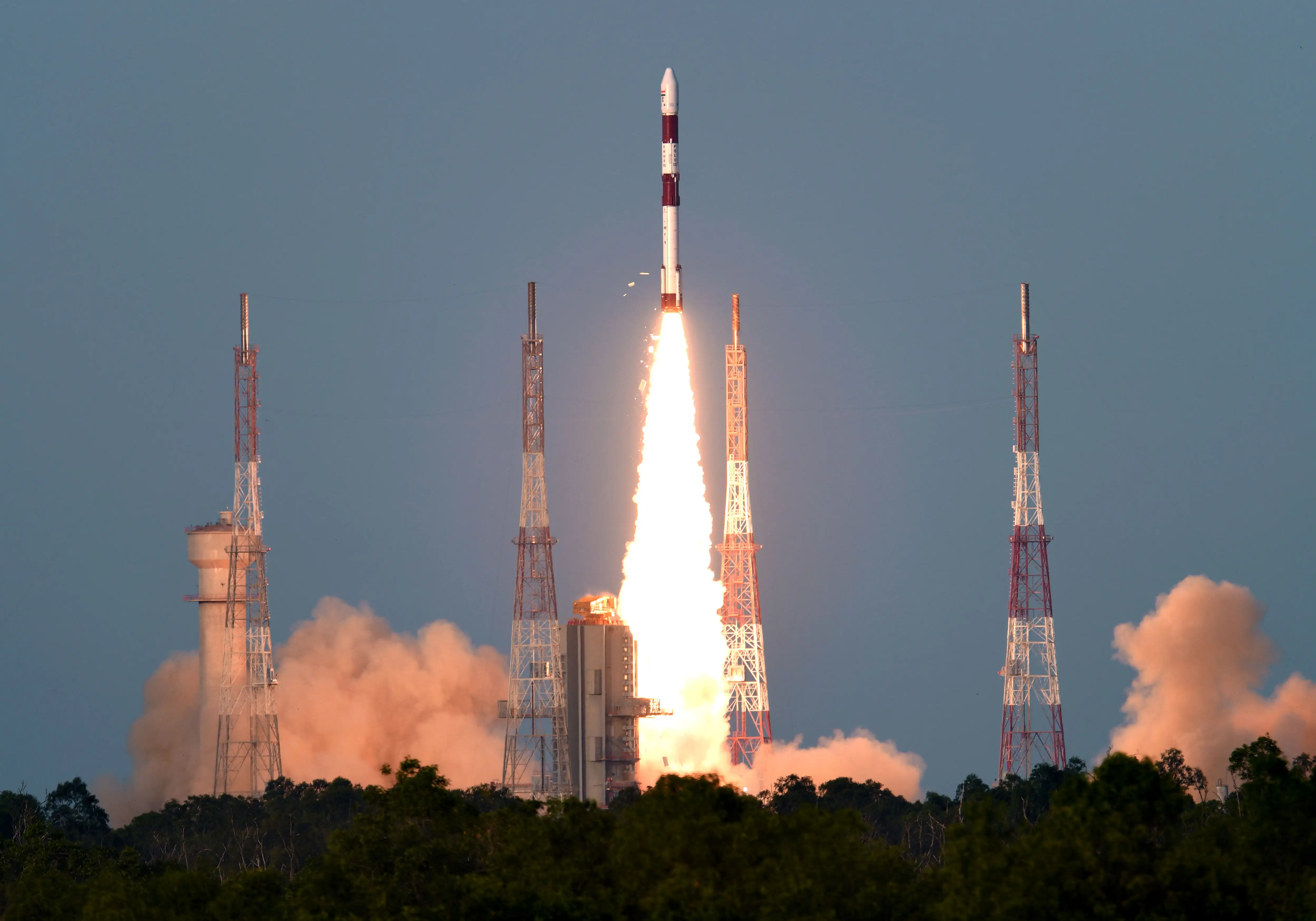
PSLV C53 Clears Second Launch Pad of Satish Dhawan Space Centre, Shriharikota

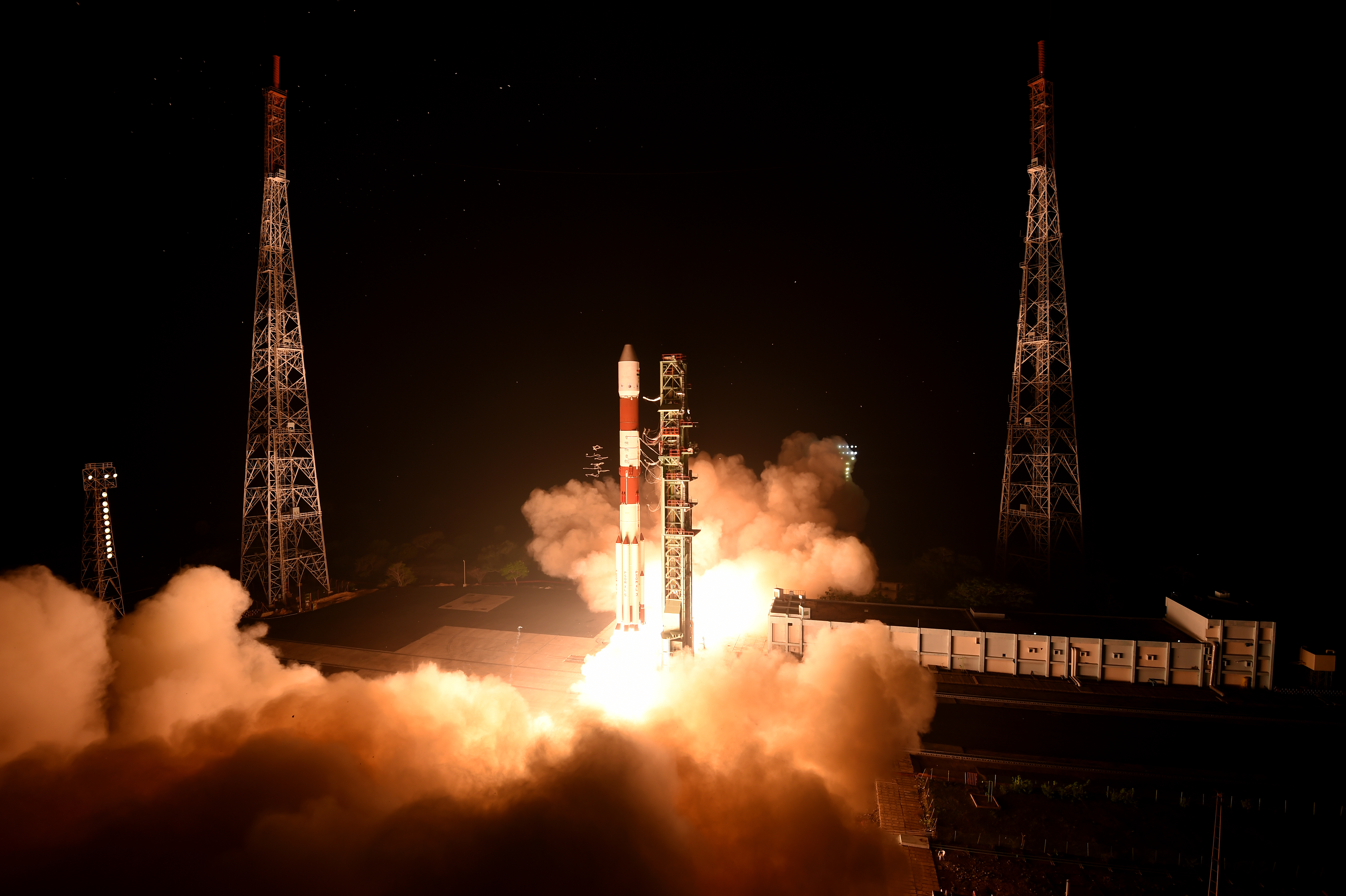
PSLV C52 lifting off from First Launch Pad

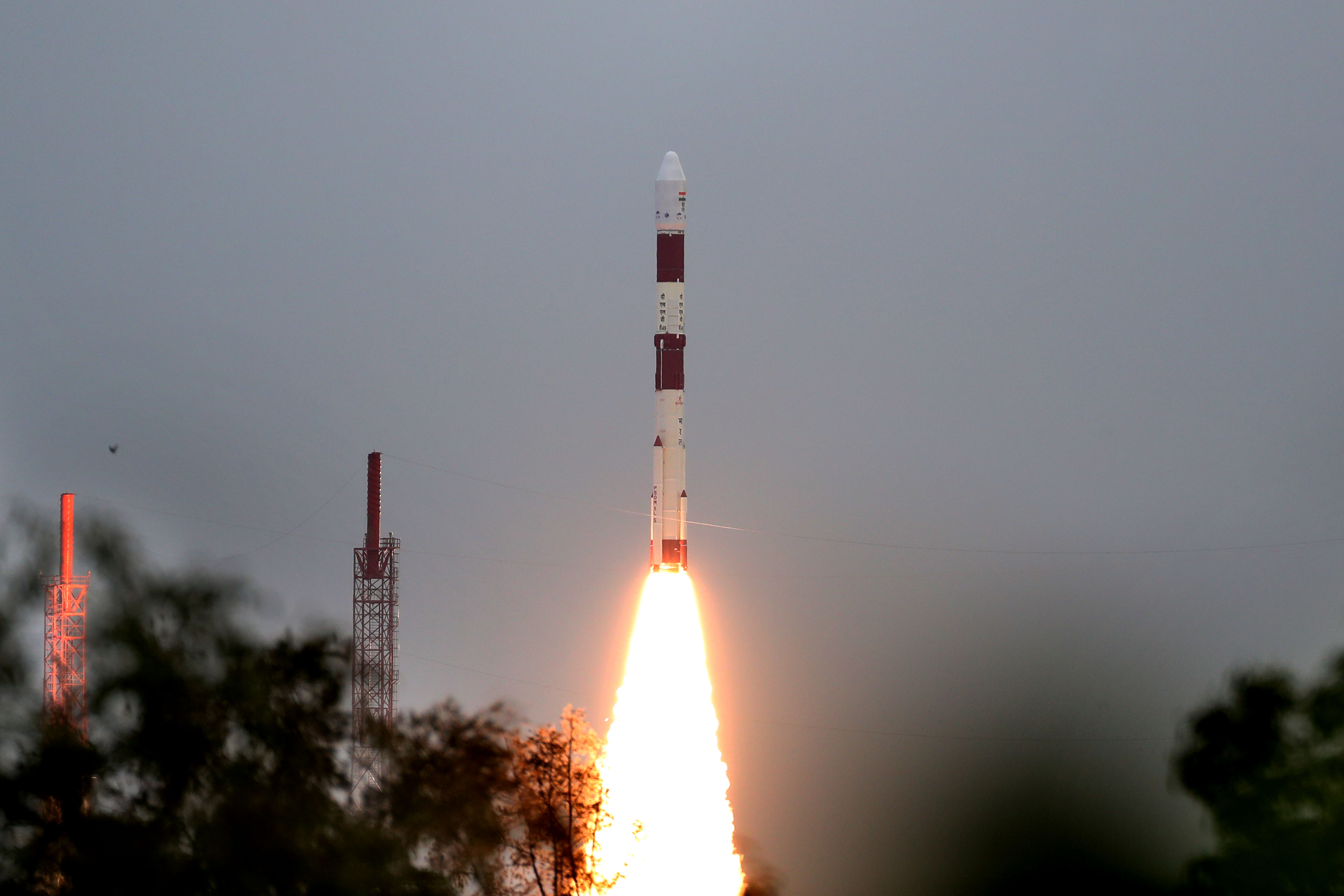
PSLV-C49 lift off

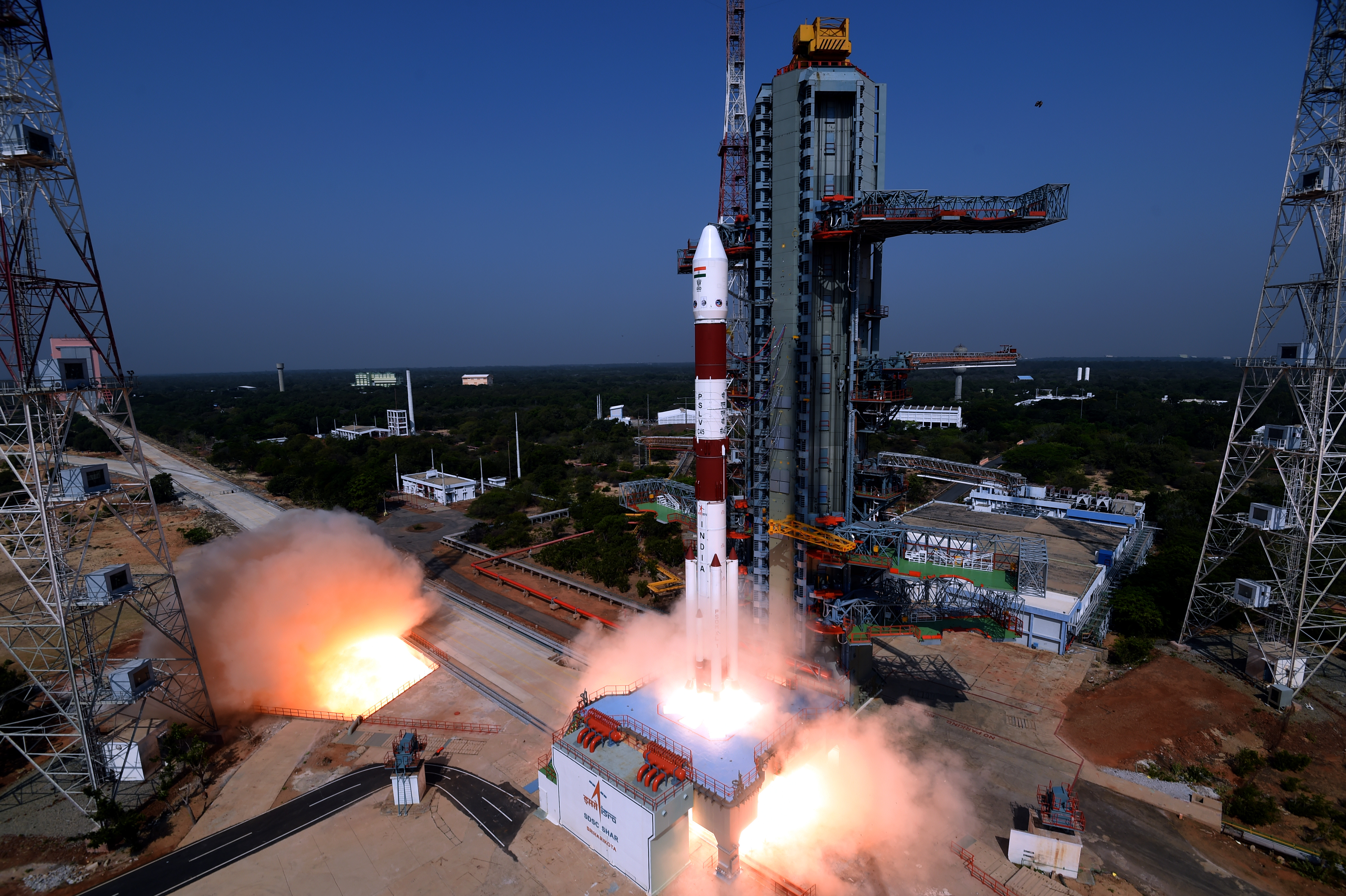
PSLV C45 ignition

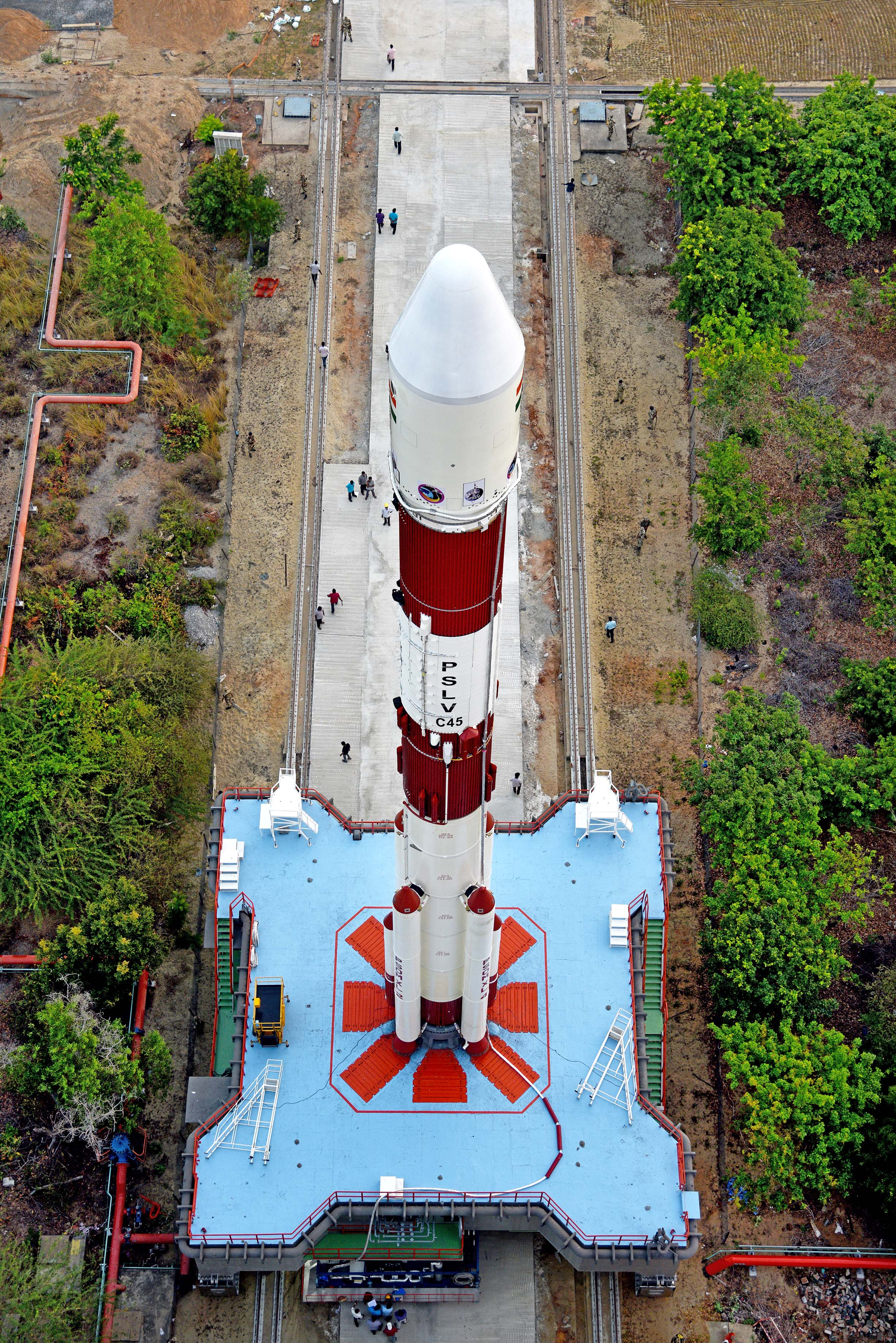
Top view of PSLV C45

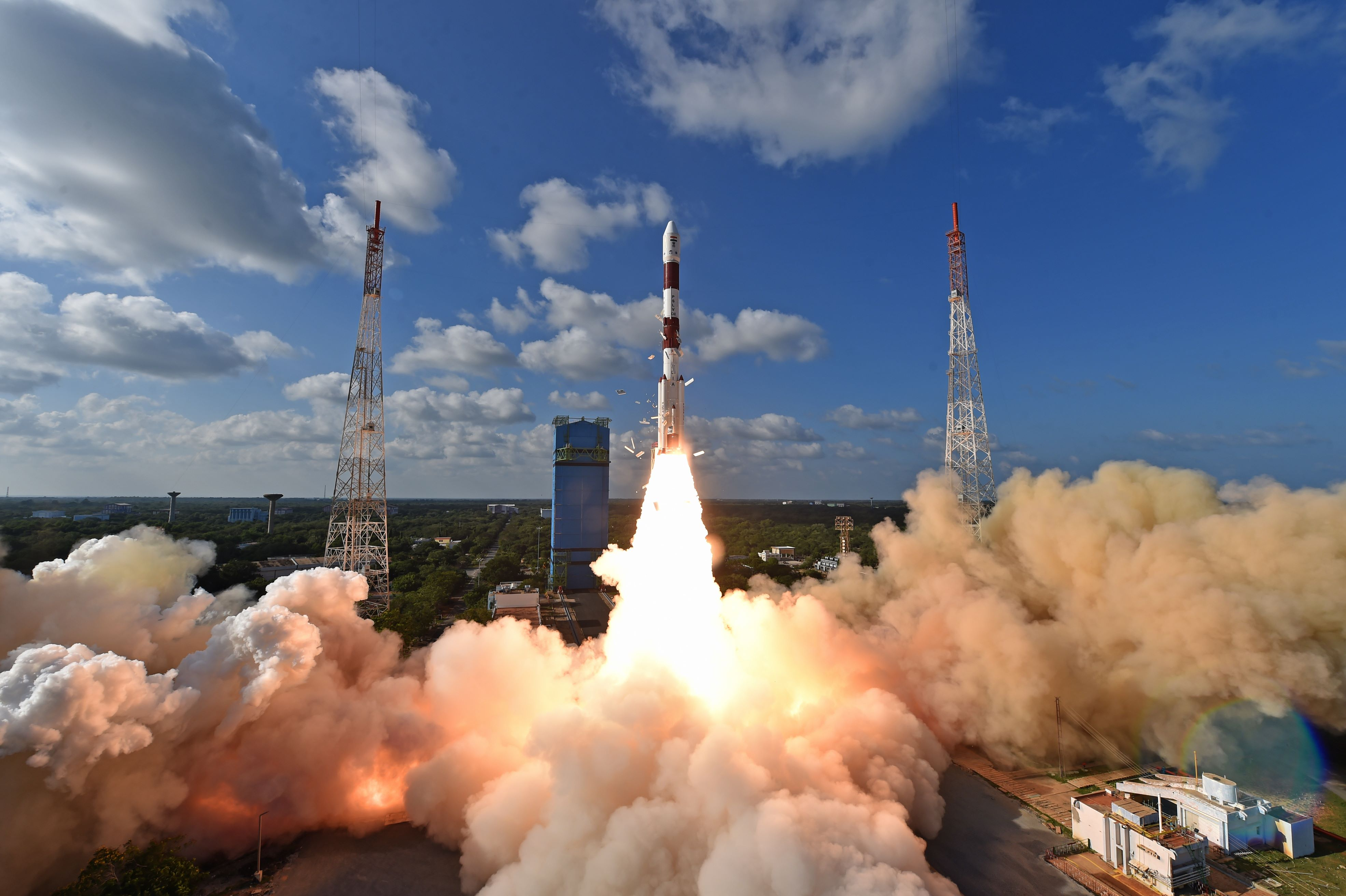
PSLV C48 RISAT-2BR1 lift-off from First Launch Pad

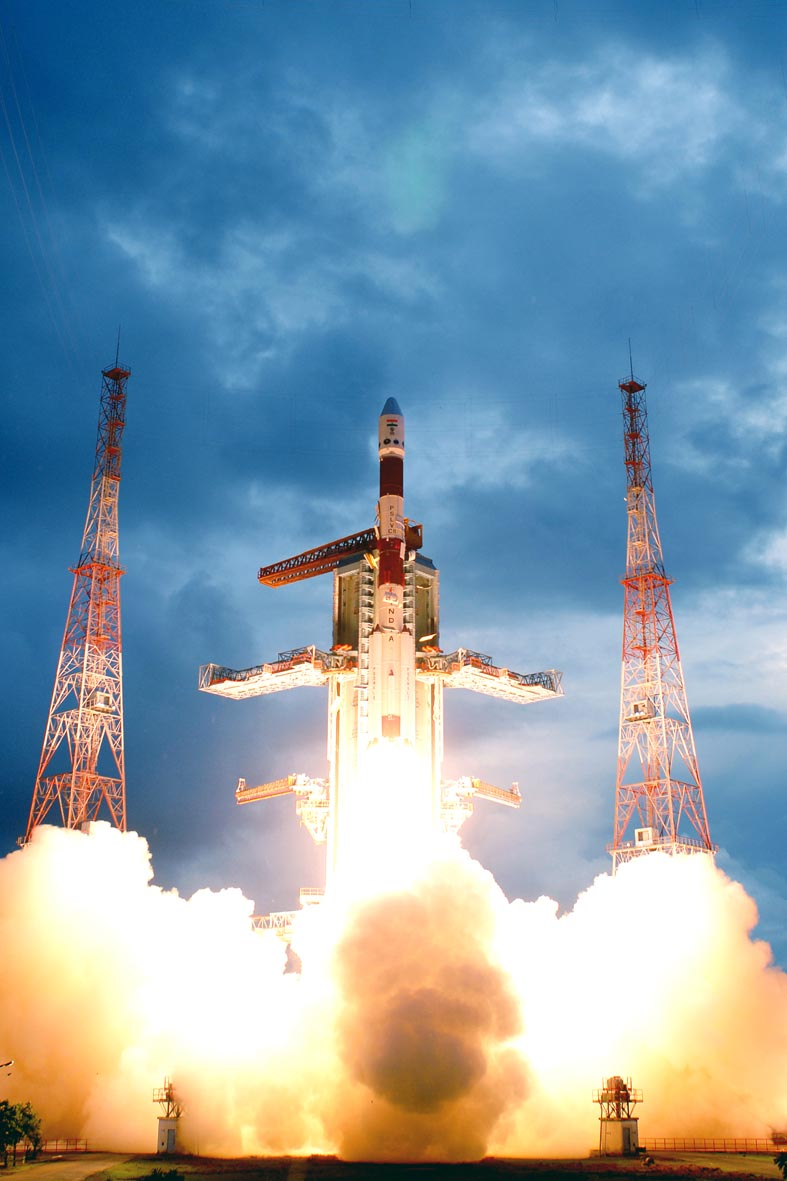
PSLV C11 lift off

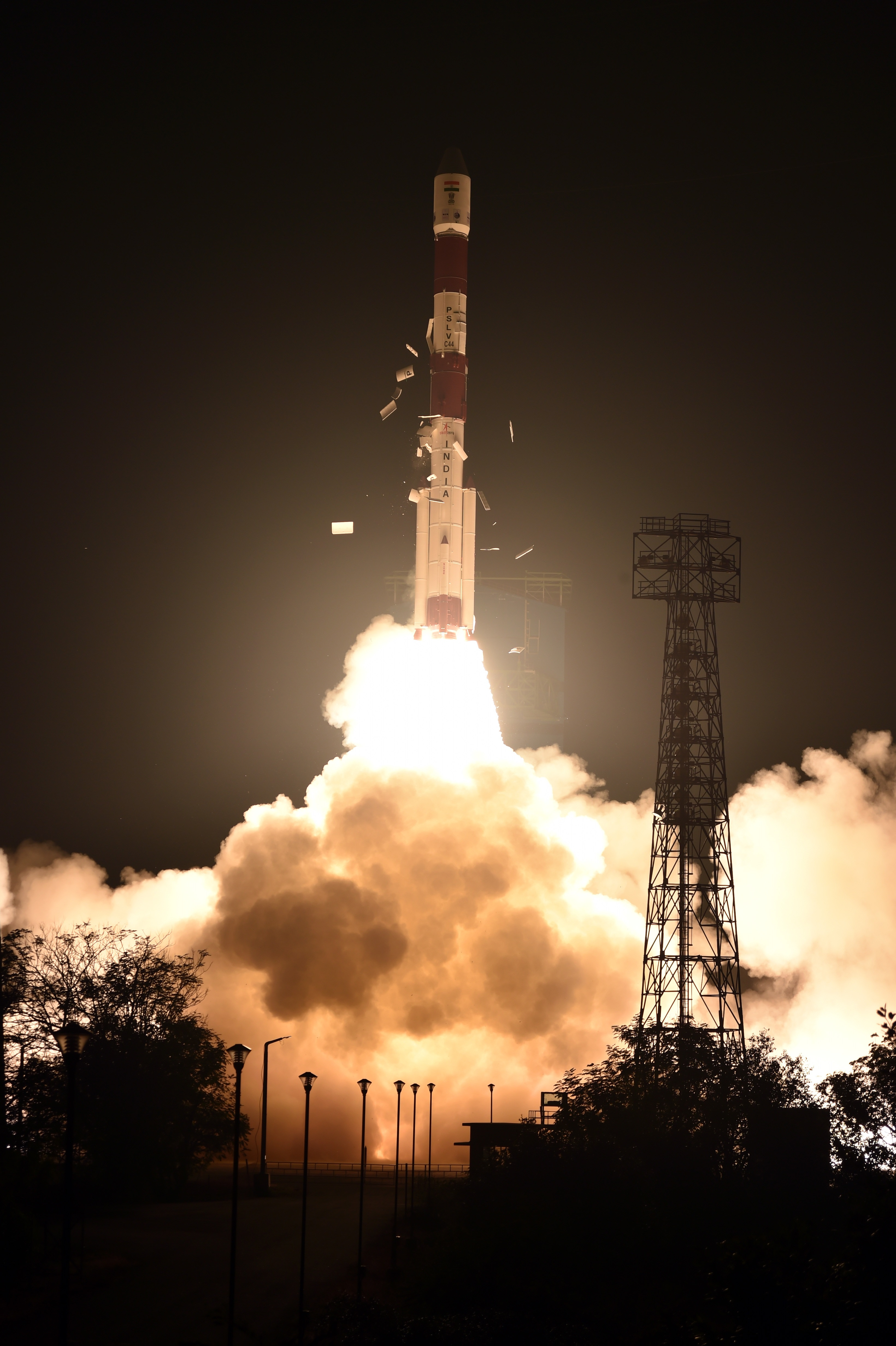
PSLV C44 lift off

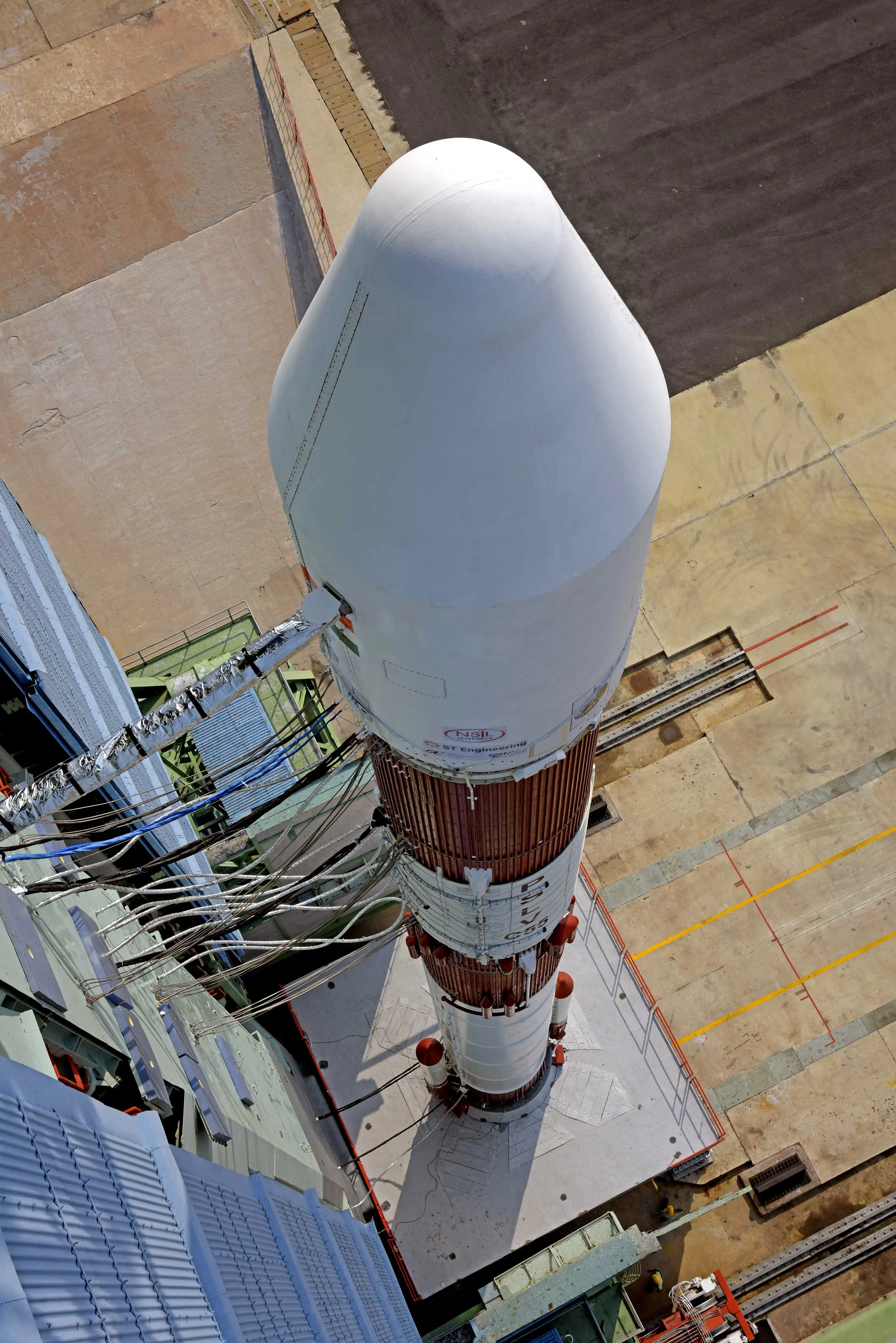
Integrated PSLV rocket

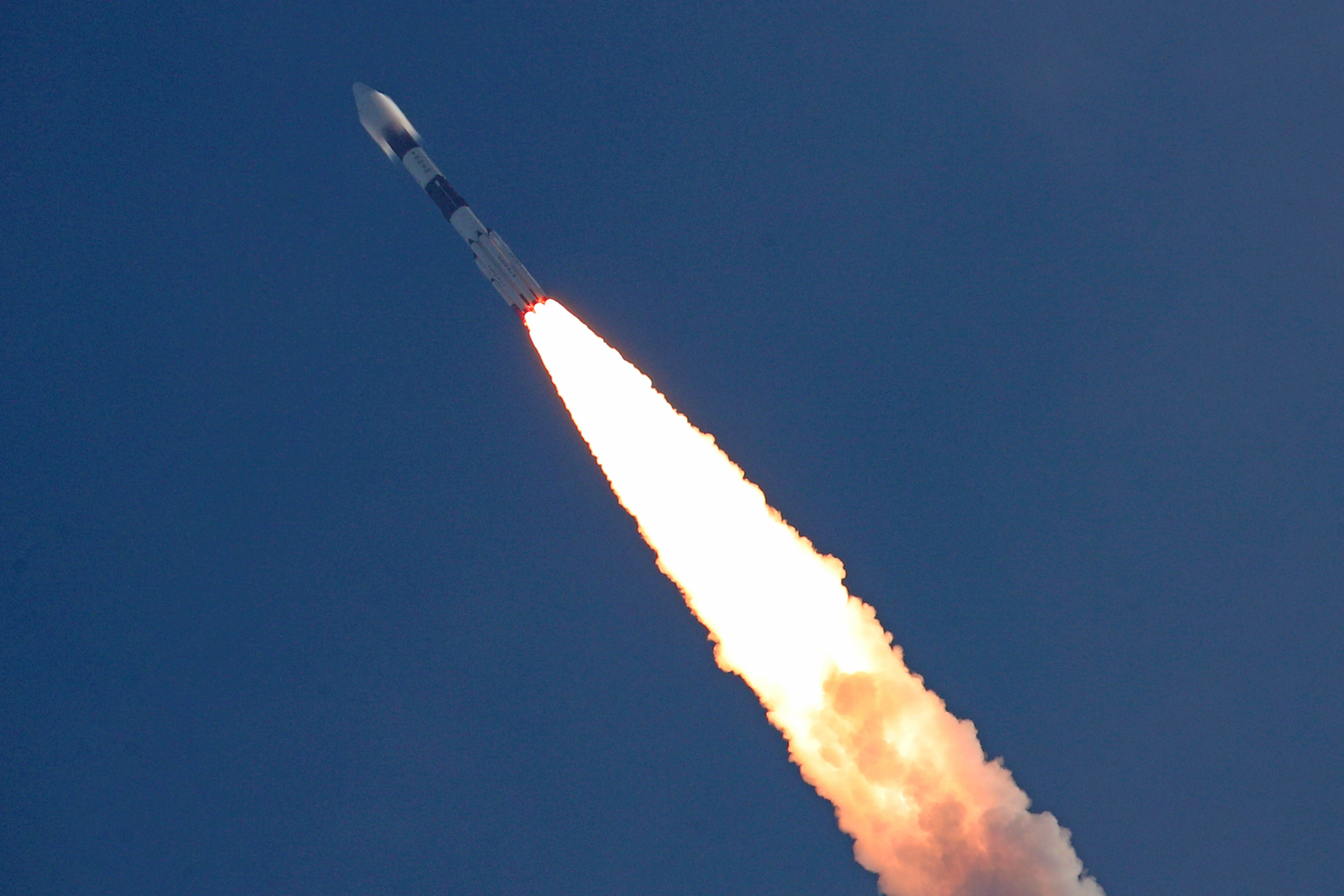
PSLV in flight

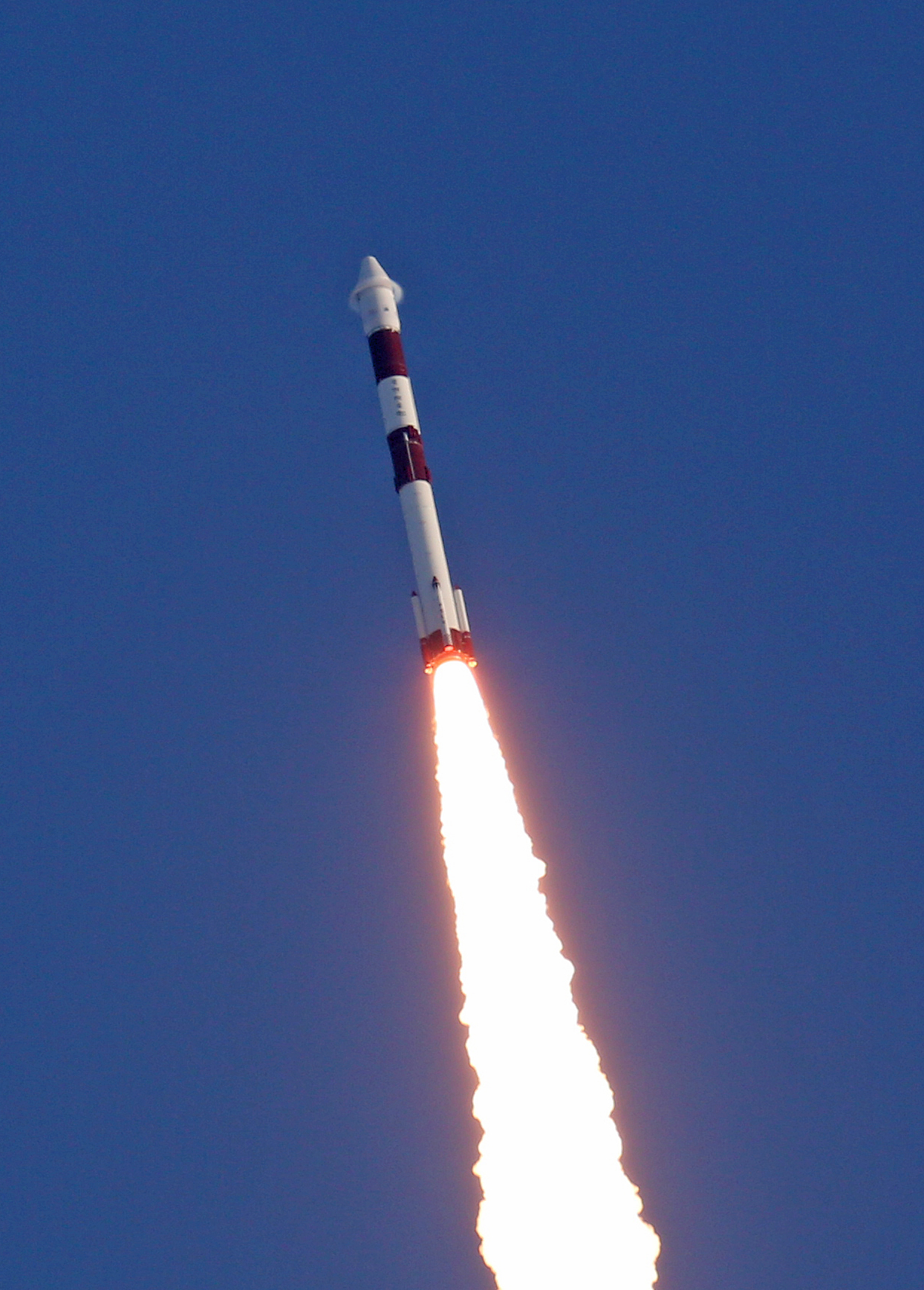
PSLV Mid-flight with a visible vapor cone or shock collar formed around payload fairing

== See also ==
- Geosynchronous Satellite Launch Vehicle – Class of Indian medium-lift expendable launch vehicles, developed by ISRO
- LVM3 – Indian expendable medium-lift launch vehicle, developed by ISRO
- Next Generation Launch Vehicle – Class of Indian partially reusable launch vehicles under development by ISRO
- SSLV
- Launch vehicles of ISRO
- Comparison of orbital launchers families
- Medium-lift launch vehicle, 2,000 to 20,000 kg to LEO
- Comparison of orbital rocket engines
- Comparison of orbital launch systems
