= Kosmos 149 =

Soviet demonstration satellite

- Mission type: Technology
- Operator: VNIIEM
- COSPAR ID: 1967-024A
- SATCAT no.: 02714
- Mission duration: 17 days

Spacecraft properties
- Spacecraft type: DS-MO
- Manufacturer: Yuzhnoye
- Launch mass: 375 kg

Start of mission
- Launch date: 21 March 1967, 10:04:00 GMT
- Rocket: Kosmos-2I 63SM
- Launch site: Kapustin Yar, Site 86/1
- Contractor: Yuzhnoye

End of mission
- Decay date: 7 April 1967

Orbital parameters
- Reference system: Geocentric
- Regime: Low Earth
- Perigee altitude: 243 km
- Apogee altitude: 285 km
- Inclination: 48.4°
- Period: 89.76 minutes
- Epoch: 21 March 1967

Kosmos 149 (Russian: Космос 149 meaning Cosmos 149), also known as DS-MO No.1 was a technology demonstration satellite which was launched by the Soviet Union in 1967 as part of the Dnepropetrovsk Sputnik programme. Its primary mission was to demonstrate orientation control by means of an aerodynamic skirt stabiliser. It also carried an optical research payload for the Soviet Armed Forces and had a mass of 375 kilograms (827 lb).

It was launched aboard a Kosmos-2I 63SM rocket from Site 86/1 at Kapustin Yar. The launch occurred at 10:07 GMT on 21 March 1967.

Kosmos 149 was placed into a low Earth orbit with a perigee of 243 kilometres (151 mi), an apogee of 285 kilometres (177 mi), an inclination of 48.4°, and an orbital period of 89.76 minutes. It decayed from orbit on 7 April 1967. Kosmos 149 was the first of two DS-MO satellites to be launched. It was succeeded by Kosmos 320, which was launched in January 1970.

== See also ==
- 1967 in spaceflight
