= List of PSLV Orbital Experiment Module Flights =

PSLV Orbital Experiment Module (POEM) also known as PSLV Stage 4 Orbital Platform (PS4-OP) is an orbital micro-gravity test bed based on spent fourth stage of the Indian Space Research Organisation's PSLV rocket.

== POEM-1 ==
In June 2022, the PSLV-C53/DS-EO campaign had its PS4-OP referred as PSLV Orbital Experiment Module (POEM) and it was first PSLV fourth stage based orbital platform to be actively stabilized using eight Helium based cold gas thrusters after the primary mission and stage passivization. POEM-1 (COSPAR ID:2022-072E, SATCAT no.:52939) had additional sensors and navigational aids (4 Sun sensors, Magnetometer, MRGPD and NavIC). It generated about 150 watts of power using non-deployable, fixed solar cells wrapped around PS4 tank. Six non-separable payloads facilitated by NSIL and IN-SPACe were hosted aboard.

1. DSOD-1U Small satellite deployer by Dhruva Space.
2. ROBI (ROBust Integrating proton fluence metre) by Digantara Research and Technologies
3. Software Defined Radio based Telemetry Multi-Media Transmitter (SDRT-MTx)
4. UHF Transmitter
5. OP-VIS - Configured with one GVIS and two cameras
6. POEM also carried preamble to the Constitution of India bearing Indian flag.

== POEM-2 ==
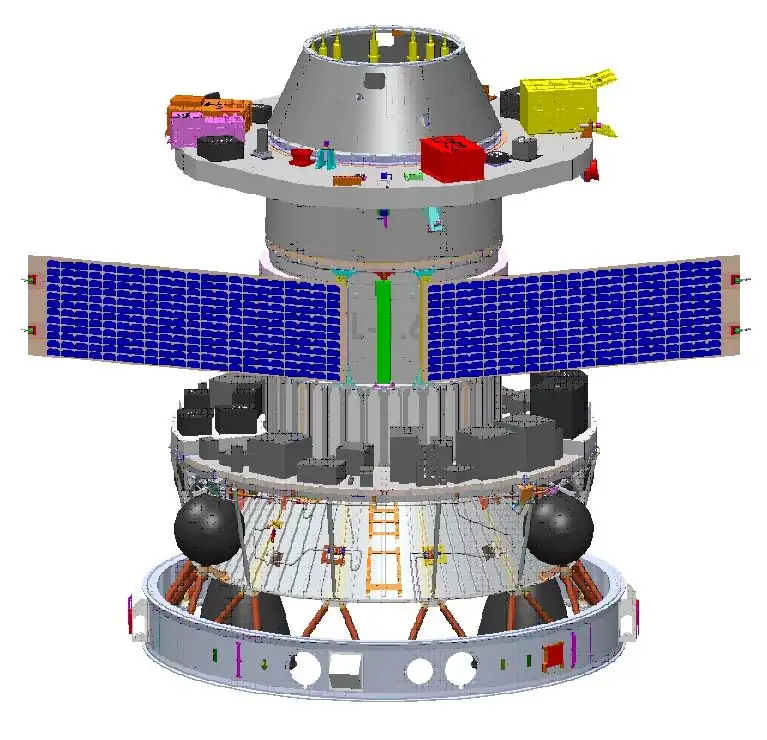
Render of POEM-2 on PSLV-C55 campaign with deployed solar panels.

In April 2023, on PSLV-C55/TeLEOS-2 campaign, seven non separable payloads were hosted by POEM. POEM-2 had flexible solar arrays wrapped around PS4 propellant tank that generated about 500 watts of power upon deployment. POEM-2 was again 3-axis stabilized by eight Helium based 1N cold gas thrusters (OPACS) developed by LPSC that utilize left-over PS4 pressurant. Expected mission life of POEM-2 (COSPAR ID:2023-057A, SATCAT no.:56308) was of one month. Payloads hosted on POEM-2 are:

1. ARIS-2 (Advanced Retarding potential analyser for Ionosphere Studies) by IIST for ionosphere studies in Low Earth Orbit.
2. PSLV-in-orbitaL OBC and Thermals (PiLOT):
3. Starberry-Sense: A low-cost Raspberry Pi Zero based star sensor by Indian Institute of Astrophysics (IIA) for cubesats.
4. ARKA200: Xenon based Hall-effect thruster (HET) by Bellatrix Aerospace.
5. DSOD-3U: Cubesat deployer by Dhruva Space.
6. DSOD-6U: Cubesat deployer by Dhruva Space.
7. DSOL-Transceiver: Satellite Orbiter Link in S & X bands.

== POEM-3 ==
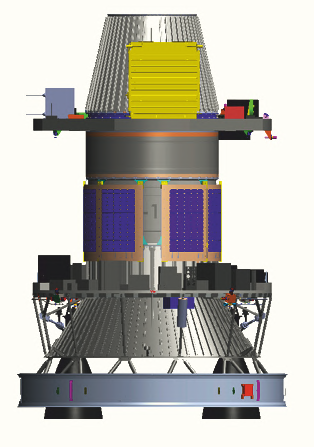
Render of POEM-3 orbital platform

On PSLV-C58/XPoSat campaign, POEM-3 hosted ten payloads weighing ~145 kg cumulatively. PSLV fourth stage was lowered to 350 km orbit at 9.6° inclination after deploying XPoSat to reach the POEM-3 operational orbit. POEM-3 will nominally be operational for a period of one month. For power generation and storage it will again have flexible solar panels in conjunction with 50Ah Li-ion battery and will be three-axis stabilized. It re-entered earths atmosphere on March 21, 2024,three months after launch. Payloads hosted on POEM-3 (COSPAR ID:2024-001A, SATCAT no.:58694) are following, seven of them facilitated by IN-SPACe and three are by ISRO,

1. Radiation Shielding Experimental Module (RSEM): Experimental payload by TakeMe2Space to evaluate effectiveness of Tantalum coating for radiation shielding.
2. Women Engineered Satellite (WESAT): Payload by LBS Institute of Technology for Women to compare and measure UV radiation in space and on Earth's surface in real-time.
3. BeliefSat-0: Amateur Band UHF to VHF FM voice repeater, and VHF APRS Digipeater satellite by K. J. Somaiya Institute of Technology.
4. Green Impulse TrAnsmitter (GITA): Green bipropellant CubeSat propulsion unit by Inspecity Space Labs.
5. Launching Expeditions for Aspiring Technologies-Technology Demonstrator (LEAP-TD): P-30 nanosatellite platform subsystems validation by Dhruva Space.
6. RUDRA 0.3 HPGP: Green Monopropellant Thruster by Bellatrix Aerospace.
7. ARKA200: Xenon based Hall-effect thruster (HET) by Bellatrix Aerospace.
8. Dust Experiment (DEX): Interplanetary dust count measurement by Physical Research Laboratory.
9. Fuel cell Power System (FCPS): Demonstration of 100 watt fuel cell power system by VSSC.
10. Si based High Energy cell: Demonstration of Silicon-based High Energy cells by VSSC.
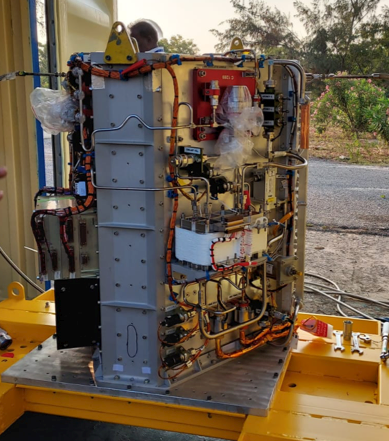
VSSC's 100 W class Polymer Electrolyte Membrane Fuel Cell based Power System (FCPS)

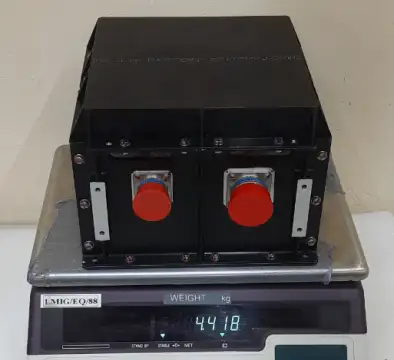
10 Ah Silicon–Graphite anode based high energy density Li-ion cell

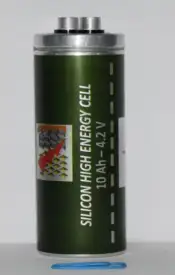
Configured payload for testing Silicon–Graphite anode based Li-ion cell

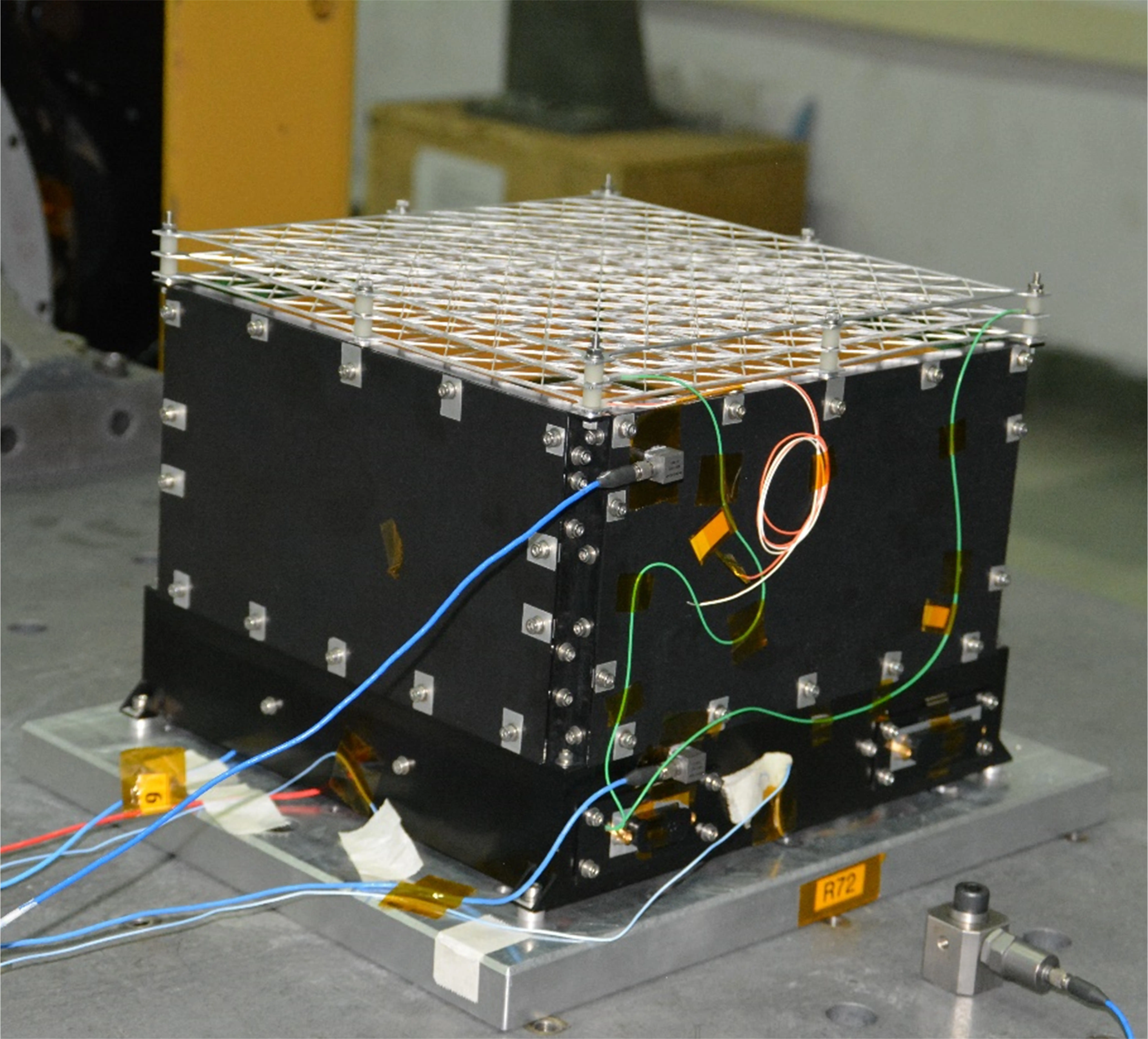
Cosmic Dust expiriment payload

Following mission conclusion, ISRO released data from the DEX instrument collected during its operational period between 01 January to 09 February 2024.

== POEM-4 ==
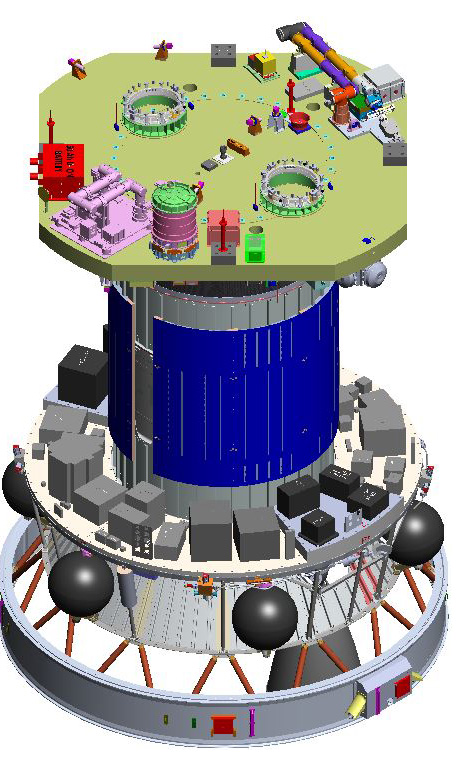
Render of POEM-4 orbital platform

POEM-4 (COSPAR ID: 2024-253C, SATCAT no.62461) was launched on 30 December 2024 on PSLV-C60/SpaDeX campaign. It hosted 24 non-separable payloads weighing nearly 120 kg. Ten of these were chosen by IN-SPACe from a variety of non-governmental entities which include startups and universities, while the remaining fourteen are from ISRO. It completed 1000 orbits around earth on 4 March 2025 and had completed most scientific objectives by then.

1. The ISRO Inertial Systems Unit (IISU) built the Relocatable Robotic Manipulator-Technology Demonstrator (RRM-TD), also called Walking Robotic Arm. With its seven degrees of freedom (DoF), it can move via inchworm motor to predetermined targets. It has robotic joints and arm controllers, a grappling mechanism and standardized adapter with power and data transfer, cameras for eye-in-hand operation, and software architecture with obstacle-aware motion planning and safety features installed on a high-compute processor. It will showcase a large workspace for in-orbit servicing. RRM-TD is the predecessor of upcoming robotic technologies for the Bharatiya Antariksh Station (BAS) which will help in end-on-end walking, microgravity operations, vision-based 6 DoF pose estimation, visual inspection of stages, robotic manipulation through visual servoing and compliance control, harness-free operation using power and data grappling fixtures, teleoperation and digital twin. RRM-TD was successfully activated on 4 January 2025 in space.
2. The Debris Capture Robotic Manipulator (DCRM), built by the Vikram Sarabhai Space Centre (VSSC), will show how a robotic manipulator employ visual servoing and object motion prediction to capture entangled debris. A parallel end-effector for object manipulation and capture will be demonstrated. The robotic manipulator will be able to refuel both free-floating and tethered spacecraft in subsequent POEM missions, as well as capture free floating space junk. On January 6, 2025, DCRM successfully demonstrated tethered debris capture.
3. For attitude control in POEM-4, IISU developed the Reaction Wheel Assembly (RWA), which has three independent field-programmable gate array-based MIL-STD-1553B automotive-grade Wheel Drive Electronics (WDE) with secondary power management integrated circuits, and brushless DC electric motor (BLDC) control circuits for the three Reaction Wheels with a torque of 0.02 N⋅m and a momentum storage capacity of 5 N⋅m (at 10,000 RPM).
4. IISU designed the Multi-Sensor Inertial Reference System (MIRS) to demonstrate and assess the performance of new space-grade miniaturized Electronic Dosimeter, ISRO Coriolis Resonating Gyro-Digital (ICRG-D), Tuning Fork Gyroscopes (TFG), and Advanced Geomagnetic Sensors (AGS).
5. To evaluate the dependability and performance of a RoHS-compliant system in a microgravity, VSSC developed a lead-free environmental friendly DC-to-DC converter for Lead Exempt Experimental System (LEXS). For Gaganyaan, a MEMS-based angular rate sensor had been developed to check the high angular rates that the Crew Module would encounter in CARE, Pad-Abort, and Air-Drop tests. In addition to measuring angular rates along three dimensions, LEXS will examine the behavior of the rate sensor in space and verify its functionality.
6. For conducting scientific experiments onboard sounding rockets, POEM, and spacecraft, the Space Physics Laboratory (SPL) developed a programmable and configurable onboard controller Payload Common Onboard Computer (P-COC), that can interface with a variety of passive, active, and smart sensors and their front-end electronics. The Electron Temperature Analyzer (ETA), Langmuir Probe (LP), and the Electron Density and Neutral Wind (ENWi) are all controlled and operated by P-COC in IDEA-V2 payload of POEM-4. Ionospheric studies such as electron temperature and electron density of planetary ionospheres are measured in-situ using ENWi, LP and ETA respectively. Measurements of ionospheric properties are made possible by the arrangement of three cylindrical configuration in LP. The first LP in sweep mode can be used to determine the electron temperature, the second LP can be used to estimate the electric field, and the third LP can be used to estimate the absolute electron density. Along the orbit, two ENWi payloads will record electron and ion drifts in two perpendicular orientations. ENWi will detect electron density, irregularity, and electron drift in electron mode and monitor ion density, irregularity, and ion drift in ion mode.
7. Using the L1 and L5 dual-frequency NavIC receivers, the Ionosphere TEC Measurement using NavIC (PlasDEM or Plasmaspheric electron Density Measurements), a collaborative project between SPL and IISU, will monitor the plasmaspheric electron content and its longitudinal variations. For ionosphere delay/TEC measurement, PlasDEM uses carrier phase measurements using NavIC signals.
8. VSSC developed Laser Firing Unit (LFU) and Laser Initiation Pyro Unit (LIP) that will demonstrate an in-orbit test of pyro thrusters using a laser-based firing unit instead of electrical firing circuits. It improves safety, has fewer execution modules and package harnesses, decreases the overall weight, size, and power requirement.
9. Compact Research Module for Orbital Plant Studies (CROPS), a multi-phase automated platform developed by VSSC, aims to build the capacity to cultivate and maintain vegetation in outer space. To demonstrate seed germination and plant nutrition, a five to seven-day experiment is planned. Vigna unguiculata will be cultivated in the closed-box setting with active heat management. CROPS can use camera imagery to passively monitor plant growth and measure soil moisture, temperature, relative humidity, and the levels of oxygen and carbon dioxide. The test was successful. ISRO expressed hope for the future development and implementation of the Environment Control and Life Support System (ECLSS) at the Gaganyaan and Bharatiya Antariksha Station based on its utilization during the experiment.
10. The Indian Institute of Space Science and Technology's (IIST) PILOT-G2 (GRACE) is designed to space-qualify the cubesat ultra high frequency communication board for safe and effective command reception from ground stations in space, the Geiger-Müller Counter (GMC) that can detect Gamma/X-rays (≥40 keV), beta particles (50-150 keV), and alpha particles (≥2.5 MeV), and an in-orbit reprogramming of field-programmable gate array with non-volatile memory over the on-board computer to ensure adaptability for post-launch updates. PILOT-G2 will study the effect of space radiation on satellite operation.
11. The Amity Plant Experimental Module in Space (APEMS), designed by Amity Centre of Excellence in Astrobiology (Amity University, Mumbai), will investigate the growth and adaptation of plant cells in microgravity using Spinacia oleracea in real-time. APEMS uses cameras to track growth, a gel for nutrients, and LEDs for light. It will aid in the understanding of plant growth in space. The development of Spinacia oleracea callus was verified on January 11, 2025. The result mirrored the outcome of a laboratory experiment conducted in parallel. The payload is in good shape, and factors such internal lighting, humidity, and carbon dioxide have been examined. The experiment will run for 21 days.
12. Using FM modulation and the VHF band, S J C Institute of Technology and the Upagraha Amateur Radio Club at the U R Rao Satellite Center developed Amateur Radio Payload for Information Transmission (ARPIT), a multi-mode message transmitter for text, audio, and images from a satellite to the ground station.
13. To better understand human physiology in space, and promote developments in antibiotics, waste recycling, bioremediation and space exploration, the RVSat-1 payload, built by Team Antariksh from RV College of Engineering, will investigate the growth dynamics of Bacteroides thetaiotaomicron using prebiotics under microgravity.
14. Improved on the RUDRA 0.3 High Performance Green Propellant (HPGP) payload carried in POEM-3, Bellatrix Aerospace developed RUDRA 1.0 HPGP. With a specific impulse of 220 seconds, it provides a nominal thrust of 1 N. It will demonstrate steady-state thruster firing for at least 50 seconds, and track the propulsion system's thermal profile operating in both steady state and pulsed modes.
15. Manastu Space developed VYOM-2U, a hydrogen peroxide-based satellite thruster to demonstrate the performance improvement over hydrazine with high thrust, efficiency, and long continuous firing capacity. It features maximum continuous firing time of 1,000 seconds, a specific impulse of >250 seconds, a total impulse of >1200 Ns, and a thrust range of 1.1 N. The test was completed successfully on December 31, 2024. Professor Jayesh Bellare of Chemical Engineering, Professor Parag Bhargava of Metallurgical Engineering & Materials Science, and Professor Amol Gokhale of Mechanical Engineering at IIT Bombay developed the initial prototypes and key technologies. VYOM 2U is prepared for commercial deployment after achieving Technology Readiness Level 8 (TRL-8). The thrusters are made to deorbit satellites and perform collision-avoidance maneuvers.
16. The SAR Imaging Demonstration Payload (GLX-SQ) was built by GalaxEye Space Solutions which incorporates the SyncFusion system, that can process and compress the combined optical and synthetic-aperture radar imagery data. It can reduce 400 MB of raw data to less than 1.5 MB in 10 minutes. The payload is the foundation for future Drishti missions, which will send 32 highest-resolution multi-sensor imaging satellite in the world into orbit by 2028. The primary mission of the SyncFusion system was achieved on February 20, 2025, when the SAR successfully acquired and processed imagery in the South Atlantic Anomaly under elevated radiation exposure. The thermal insulation systems operated at -10 °C. Another test was scheduled for 150 °C.
17. Piersight Space built Varuna to demonstrate a synthetic-aperture radar in cubesat. The demonstration will qualify the X-band radio for data downlink, test software-defined radar and radio (SDRR), solid state power amplifier (SSPA), reflectarray antenna and feed, and reflectarray deployable structure in orbit. Varuna is the first step towards the establishment of a constellation of 32 SAR and Automatic Identification System (SAIS) satellites for ocean surveillance. It has won the India-U.S. Defense Acceleration Ecosystem (INDUS-X) Maritime Intelligence, Surveillance, and Recognizance (ISR) Challenge. According to The Time of India report, the demonstration was successful.
18. Nspace Tech built the SwetchaSAT-V0, part of the SwetchaSAT-Vx series to show that the onboard UHF transmitter can function by establishing a dependable communication link with the ISRO Telemetry, Tracking and Command Network (ISTRAC). It can be used in both transmission and storage modes for telemetry downlink and environmental data gathering, respectively. It can comprehensively monitor ionospheric parameters. On January 1, 2025, SwetchaSat-V0 successfully transmitted the first batch of network packet to the ISTRAC ground station in Bengaluru. In subsequent missions, company hopes to further extend the capabilities into Ku-band frequencies.
19. In order to test and evaluate the performance of four commercial off-the-shelf MEMS-based 9-axis IMU sensors and ARM-based microcontrollers for attitude determination and effective data processing, MIT World Peace University designed the STeRG-P1.0. High-resolution data collection and storage, along with data filtration for increased accuracy, are all incorporated in STeRG-P1.0.
20. The My Orbital Infrastructure-Technology Demonstrator (MOI-TD) payload, manufactured by TakeMe2Space, will showcase an AI Lab in orbit that will process Earth observation data in real time, test subsystems, and use AI to take and examine high-quality Earth imagery. Smartcircuits Innovation will use MOI-TD for satellite temperature profiling with the use of an external sensor positioned at the outermost surface of POEM-4. It will process data in real time while in orbit, removing the need to send data back to Earth.

Following completion of mission objectives, POEM-4 was de-orbited by engine restarts to reduce its orbit to a nearly circular orbit at 350 km altitude with 55.2 inclination. The PS4 was then passivated as its orbit decayed to a 174 x 165 km. Tracked by ISRO radar, POEM-4 made a controlled re-entery into the atmosphere and impacted in the Indian Ocean, off the coast of Australia at about 02:33 UTC (08:03 IST) on April 4, 2025.

== Future payloads ==
List of payloads proposed to be hosted aboard POEM on a future flight.

- Quantum Entanglement Studies in Space (QuantESS) by SAC/PRL.
- Atomic Oxygen Sensor (ATOXS) by SPL/VSSC
- Near Ultraviolet Transient Surveyor (NUTS)
- Smart Space Robot Experiment
- Potential experiments related to space robotics, proximity operations etc.

== See also ==
- Satellite bus
- List of Indian satellites
