= Bharatiya Antariksh Station =

Proposed Indian Space Station

Bharatiya Antariksh Station (Indian Space Station)
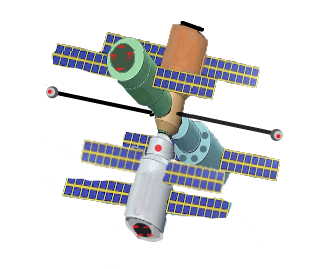
- A graphical sketch of the BAS concept

Station statistics
- Crew: 3-4 (long term) + 3 (short term)
- Launch: First module: 2028 (planned); Completion: 2035 (planned)
- Carrier rocket: LVM3, LVM3-SC
- Launch pad: Satish Dhawan Space Centre (expected third or second launch pad)
- Mission status: Under design phase
- Mass: 54 tons
- Pressurised volume: 100 cubic meter
- Orbital inclination: 51.5°
- Typical orbit altitude: 450 km

Bharatiya Antariksh Station (BAS; transl. Indian Space Station; ISO: Bhāratīya Antarikṣa Sṭeśan) is a planned modular space station to be constructed by India and operated by ISRO. The space station is planned to weigh 52 tonnes and maintain an orbit of approximately 400 kilometres above the Earth, where astronauts could stay for 3–6 months. Originally planned to be completed by 2030, it was later postponed to 2035 due to delays caused by technical issues related to the Gaganyaan crewed spaceflight mission and the COVID-19 pandemic in India. As of December 2023, the first module is expected to be launched in 2028 on an LVM3 launch vehicle, with the remaining modules to be launched by 2035 on the Next Generation Launch Vehicle.

ISRO's robotic manipulator (device) for Bharatiya Antariksh Station (BAS), at 9th Bengaluru Space Expo 2026, BIEC

== History ==
=== Early proposals ===
In 2019, ISRO chief K. Sivan presented the features of the proposed space station for the first time, saying that the space station may weigh up to 20 tons. Three years later, in his New Year's speech delivered before retiring as chairman, Sivan stated that India's first crewed spaceflight project Gaganyaan had completed the design phase and entered into the testing phase, hinting that the organization has achieved a breakthrough in reaching the space mission milestone.

In 2023, chief S. Somanath said: "Our Gaganyaan programme is towards a human space flight capability to space and once that happens, we will be able to look at space station building in subsequent modules. The timeline for this space station project spans the next 20 to 25 years. We will be definitely looking at manned exploration, a human spaceflight for a longer duration, space exercise there in our agenda". Following on from the Gaganyaan project, completing the station and conducting a crewed Moon landing by the year 2040 has been set as ISRO's goal for the upcoming decade, with a whole host of new projects and undertakings to come up in support of the mission.

During his visit to India in November 2023, NASA administrator Bill Nelson expressed NASA's readiness to support India's goal of building a commercial space station by 2040 if India seeks such collaboration. This potential partnership could leverage the expertise and experience of both countries, fostering innovation and advancing human presence in space between the two Artemis Accords signatories. In December 2023, Somanath stated that ISRO had a 25-year roadmap extending to the year 2047. This included plans to launch the first space station module in 2028 and complete the station by 2035.

=== Cabinet approval ===
Expanding the scope of the Gaganyaan initiative, the Union Cabinet, led by Prime Minister Narendra Modi, approved on 18 September 2024, the development of the Bharatiya Antariksh Station's initial module, BAS-1. The launch of the BAS-1 unit is one of the eight missions that are now part of the redesigned Gaganyaan program, which is scheduled for completion by December 2028. Hardware requirements and more unmanned flights are part of this expansion, which is meant to supplement the continuing human spaceflight programs. The Gaganyaan initiative has received an extra ₹11,170 crore (equivalent to ₹120 billion or US$1.3 billion in 2026) in financing to support its expanded scope, bringing the total budget to ₹20,193 crore (equivalent to ₹220 billion or US$2.3 billion in 2026). With four missions under the ongoing Gaganyaan program scheduled by 2026, the development of the BAS-1 module and four additional missions for technology demonstration and validation by 2028, the program aims to develop and demonstrate critical technologies for long-duration human space missions.

=== Development ===
Speaking to the media during the India International Science Festival 2024, ISRO Chairman S. Somanath said that he had been reviewing the designs of the Indian Space Station developmental tests, which could begin from 2025. ISRO is planning to establish a basic, preliminary model of the space station in 2028 before building the larger, final version in 2035. The space agency is in discussions with industry to produce, evaluate, and introduce the first module by 2028. In addition to offering insights into India's Space Vision 2047, Somanath on 26 October 2024, presented the idea of Bharatiya Antariksha Station serving as a base for lunar exploration on Sardar Patel Memorial Lecture. Jitendra Singh Rana, India's Minister of State for Science & Technology and Earth Sciences, called SpaDeX's achievement a significant step forward in the establishment of Bharatiya Antariksh Station.

According to ISRO Chairman S. Somanath, the Indian Space Station is in the final stages of design as of February 2024. The electronics for the station will be produced at the U. R. Rao Satellite Centre (URSC) in Bengaluru, while the Vikram Sarabhai Space Centre (VSSC) will help in hardware development.In June 2024, S. Somanath informed NDTV about the completion of detailed design work for the space station's Phase-1 module, which is scheduled to launch on LVM3 in 2028. The complete project and cost estimate report is ready for government approval. The module will initially accommodate robotic operations. Human activity will start in 2035.On 9 October 2024, it was announced that the station will have a five-module configuration, consisting of the base, core, science, lab and common working modules. All modules will have individual solar panels except for the Common Working Module.

== Design ==
The BAS will have 5 modules connected via the Common Berthing Mechanism. The entire station will have dimensions of 27m × 20m, It will have a maximum short duration crew capacity of 6 astronauts and a nominal crew size of 3-4 astronauts. BAS will orbit between 400–450 km with an inclination of 51.6° making it accessible to American, Russian, Japanese as well European Space Agency's spaceports. The establishment of the Bharatiya Antariksha Station is poised to enhance India's presence in space research and exploration significantly as it will provide a unique platform for conducting scientific experiments in microgravity and foster advancements in space technology, potentially leading to economic activities based on lunar resources by 2047.

Two to four astronauts could stay in space on the BAS. The crew module and rocket that will transport humans to and from the space station will dock at one end of the station. India is creating a unique docking port that will work with the International Space Station's docking port. At least four pairs of solar panels and four distinct modules are possible for the Indian Space Station once it is finished. In case of an emergency, it will also feature a permanently docked safety crew module escape system. According to the existing blueprints, the Bharatiya Antariksha Station would be powered by two sizable solar panels in the initial phase.

=== Key Features of BAS ===
Sources:

- Total Mass: ~ 52 tons
- Dimensions: 27 m × 20 m
- Estimated Pressurized Volume: ~ 265 m^{3}
- Estimated Habitable Volume Range: ~ 105 m^{3}
- Crew Capacity: 3–4 (nominal), maximum 6 (short duration)
- Orbit: Circular, 400–450 km altitude, 51.5° inclination
- Nodes: 2 (for connecting modules)
- Velocity Vector Orientation: Aligned for efficient orbital operations
- Docking Provisions: Available in all modules for cargo and crew vehicles
- Berthing Capability: Dedicated in Module 5 (CBM Module) with 4 CBM ports
- Robotic Systems: Robotic arm, free-flyers, humanoid support
- Observation Facilities: Cupola module with viewports
- EVA Support: Designed for Extra-Vehicular Activities (spacewalks)

=== Technology development ===
==== Power supply ====
A polymer electrolyte membrane Fuel Cell Power System (FCPS) created by the VSSC was successfully launched by ISRO on 1 January 2024, as part of the PSLV-C58 mission. Its purpose is to evaluate the possible power supply for the future Indian Space Station. The PSLV Orbital Experiment Module, or POEM-3, will be used for technological validation. Additionally, new silicon-based high-power energy cells will be tested by VSSC.

The successful test of FCPS, a 100 Watt payload, onboard POEM-3 was reported by ISRO on 2 January 2024. Under high pressure, a chemical reaction was sparked using oxygen and hydrogen, when moved through a fuel cell assembly. It assisted in producing 180 Watt electricity and clean drinking water as byproduct. The complete system functioned as planned in radiation-filled, temperature-extreme, and weightless environment.The next phase will be the construction of a 100 Kilowatt system. Fuel cells have already been constructed by ISRO and provided to other organizations for testing. The International Space Station (ISS) is already using this technology, but ISRO is working to broaden its application. On board POEM-3, the 10 Ampere-hour high-power energy cells based on silicon–graphite anode were also tested. These lithium-ion batteries are lightweight, have a compact design, and an improved energy density thanks to the silicon-graphite content. The energy cells have crimped sealing based design which reduces the hardware and fabrication costs. It is expected to save 35-40% of battery mass on future space missions.

==== Docking and berthing of spacecraft ====
ISRO tested space docking capabilities aboard the SpaDeX mission, and plans to deploy it on Chandrayaan-4 and future missions to Gaganyaan and BAS. A project report that includes all the information, a study and internal evaluation, and a cost estimate has been prepared and is about to be approved by the government.

== Modules ==
Bharatiya Antariksh Station Modules
#	Module	Size (Envelope)	Mass (kg)	Launch Vehicle
BAS-01	Base Module	3.8 m dia × 8.00 m	9186	LVM3
BAS-02	Core Module	3.8 m dia × 9.25 m	10033	LVM3
BAS-03	Science Module	3.8 m dia × 9.25 m	10896	LVM3-SC
BAS-04	Lab Module	3.8 m dia × 9.25 m	10646	LVM3-SC
BAS-05	CBM Module	3.8 m dia × 9.25 m	10969	LVM3-SC
RM	Robotic Manipulator Arm	-	-	LVM3 (piggyback launch)

=== BAS-01 Base Module ===
BAS-1 will serve as a test bed for essential technologies, such as life support systems and crew quarters. During the 2025 National Space Day celebrations at Bharat Mandapam in New Delhi, ISRO unveiled a scale-model of the BAS-01 module. Around 3.8-meters long, 8-meters in diameter and weighing in at 10 tonnes, it will have indigenous Environmental Control and Life Support System (ECLSS), the Bharat Docking System (BDS), Bharat Berthing Mechanism (BBM), and an automated hatch system.In January 2026, VSSC invited commercial players to begin construction of BAS-01 module. It's estimated development and launch cost is approximately ₹1,763 crore (US$190 million) and it is presently targeted for launch by late 2028.

=== Robotic Arm ===
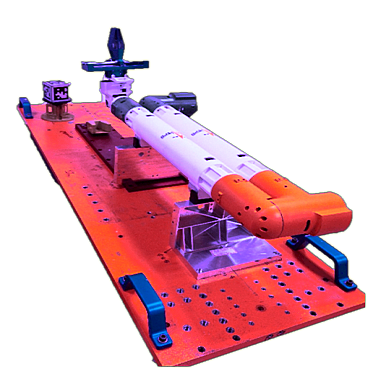
A test model of the robotic arm, as flown on POEM-4

A robotic arm is also planned for BAS. It is planned to aid in space station construction. A prototype developed by VSSC was tested on POEM-4 mission on 4 January 2025.

== International collaboration ==
A Joint Statement of Intent on Human Space Exploration was signed by ISRO and the European Space Agency (ESA) on 7 May 2025, during the Global Space Exploration Conference 2025. It emphasizes Low Earth orbit (LEO) operations, such as compatibility of docking and rendezvous systems, collaboration in parabolic flight operations, analog missions on Earth, and astronaut training. Both agencies will work together to investigate large-scale space missions in the future. ESA is planning to use BAS with possibility of future visits and research by European astronauts. ESA will assist ISRO in developing the BAS by providing cargo-delivery support. The joint statement expands on past agreements that allowed the two agencies to promote responsible and sustainable space exploration, as well as on the experience of collaborating on Axiom Mission 4. Discussions are underway between ISRO and ESA, with a preliminary proposal to be established by April 2026.

India has also expressed its interest in hosting Russian cosmonauts and potential future cooperation with Roscosmos in April 2026. Eytan Stibbe also expressed Israeli interest to partner with ISRO for the BAS program.

== See also ==
- Indian Human Spaceflight Programme
- List of space stations
