= EMISAT =

Indian reconnaissance satellite

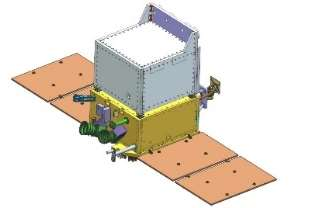
- EMISAT in deployed configuration
- Mission type: Reconnaissance
- Operator: NTRO
- COSPAR ID: 2019-018A
- SATCAT no.: 44078
- Website: www.isro.gov.in/launcher/pslv-c45-emisat-mission
- Mission duration: Planned: 5 years Elapsed: 7 years, 5 months, 23 days

Spacecraft properties
- Bus: IMS-2
- Manufacturer: DRDO; ISRO
- Launch mass: 436 kg (961 lb)
- Power: 965 W

Start of mission
- Launch date: 03:57, April 1, 2019 (UTC)
- Rocket: PSLV-QL C45
- Launch site: Satish Dhawan SLP
- Contractor: ISRO

Orbital parameters
- Reference system: Geocentric
- Apogee altitude: 749 km (465 mi)
- Inclination: 98.376 degree

EMISAT, launched on 1 April 2019, is an Indian reconnaissance satellite under Defence Research and Development Organisation (DRDO) project Kautilya which is a package that provides space-based electronic signal intelligence or ELINT. The spacecraft helps in improving the situational awareness of the Indian Armed Forces as it will provide information and location of enemy radars. The ELINT payload is developed by Defence Electronics Research Laboratory (DLRL), while augmented Indian Mini Satellite-2 (IMS-2) platform is provided by Indian Space Research Organisation (ISRO). The capabilities of the Kautilya package is highly classified. It monitors radio signals to determine the location and source of all transmission.

== See also ==
- Indian military satellites
- Indian Space Research Organisation
- List of Indian satellites
