= PSLV-C58 =

Indian space flight

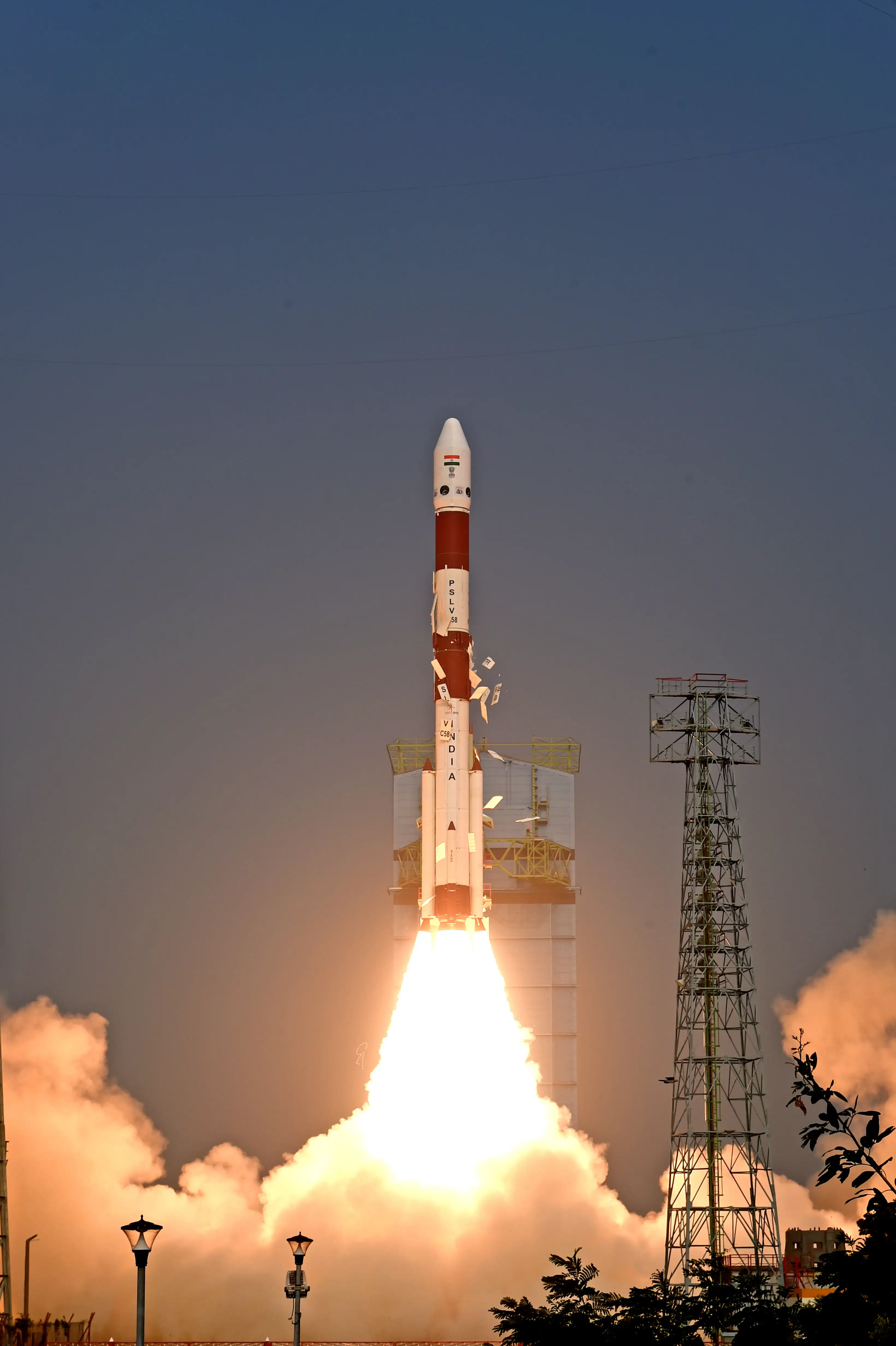

PSLV-DL launch
- Launch: 01 January 2024, 9:10 AM IST (UTC +5:30)
- Operator: Indian Space Research Organisation (ISRO)
- Pad: First Launch Pad Satish Dhawan Space Centre
- Outcome: Success

PSLV launches

The PSLV C-58 was the 60th flight of the Indian Space Research Organisation's Polar Satellite launch Vehicle. It carried the XPoSAT mission along with rideshare payloads.

== Payload ==
Besides XPoSat, the rocket carried 10 other payloads on PSLV Orbital Experiment Module (POEM) - 3.

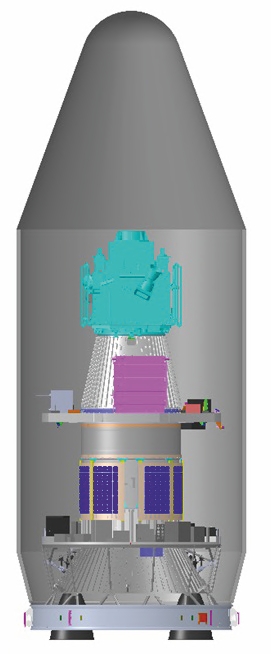
Rendering of XPoSat and POEM-3 ( also the fourth stage of the PSLV rocket ) inside the payload fairing

Alongside them, two payloads by Indian Space Research Organisation's (ISRO) Vikram Sarabhai Space Centre (VSSC) and one by the Physical Research Laboratory (PRL) were manifested for the flight.

On PSLV-C58/XPoSat campaign, POEM-3 hosted ten payloads weighing ~145 kg cumulatively. PSLV fourth stage was lowered to 350 km orbit at 9.6° inclination after deploying XPoSat to reach the POEM-3 operational orbit. For power generation and storage it will again have flexible solar panels in conjunction with 50Ah Li-Ion battery and will be three-axis stabilized. Payloads hosted on POEM-3 are following, seven of them facilitated by IN-SPACe and three are by ISRO,

1. Radiation Shielding Experimental Module (RSEM): Experimental payload by TakeMe2Space to evaluate effectiveness of Tantalum coating for radiation shielding.
2. Women Engineered Satellite (WESAT): Payload by LBS Institute of Technology for Women to compare and measure ultraviolet radiation in space and on Earth's surface in real-time.
3. BeliefSat-0: Amateur Band UHF to VHF FM voice repeater, and VHF APRS Digipeater satellite by K. J. Somaiya Institute of Technology.
4. Green Impulse TrAnsmitter (GITA): Green bipropellant CubeSat propulsion unit by Inspecity Space Labs Pvt. Ltd.
5. Launching Expeditions for Aspiring Technologies-Technology Demonstrator (LEAP-TD): P-30 nanosatellite platform subsystems validation by Indian space startup Dhruva Space.
6. RUDRA 0.3 HPGP: Green Monopropellant Thruster by Indian space startup Bellatrix Aerospace Pvt. Ltd.
7. ARKA200: Xenon based Hall-effect thruster (HET) by Bellatrix Aerospace.
8. Dust Experiment (DEX): Interplanetary dust count measurement by Physical Research Laboratory.
9. Fuel cell Power System (FCPS): Demonstration of fuel cell power system by VSSC
10. Si-based High Energy cell: Demonstration of Silicon based High Energy cells by VSSC

Two instruments from VSSC consist of twin sets of "Fuel Cell Power System (FCPS)' designed to demonstrate fuel cell technology and Silicon-based high-energy cells which can be later be used on large scale missions such as the proposed Indian Space Station, for which preliminary sources in the media indicated would be the case. On the other hand, the payload from PRL, known as the Dust Experiment (DEX), aims to quantify interplanetary dust within the low earth orbit regime.

POEM-3 later re-entered the earth's atmosphere having completed all mission objectives by the beginning of February, over the Pacific Ocean on March 21st.

== Mission overview ==
- Mass:
  - Payload weight:
- Overall height: 44.4 m (146 ft)
- Propellant:
  - Stage 1: Composite Solid
  - Stage 2: Earth Storable Liquid
  - Stage 3: Composite Solid
  - Stage 4: Earth Storable Liquid
- Propellant mass:
  - Stage 1: 139,000 kg (306,000 lb)
  - Stage 2: 41,000 kg (90,000 lb)
  - Stage 3: 7,650 kg (16,870 lb)
  - Stage 4: 1,600 kg (3,500 lb)
- Altitude: 650 km
- Maximum velocity:
- Inclination: 6.0°
- Azimuth:102°
- Period: 90.0 Minutes
