= PSLV-C45 =

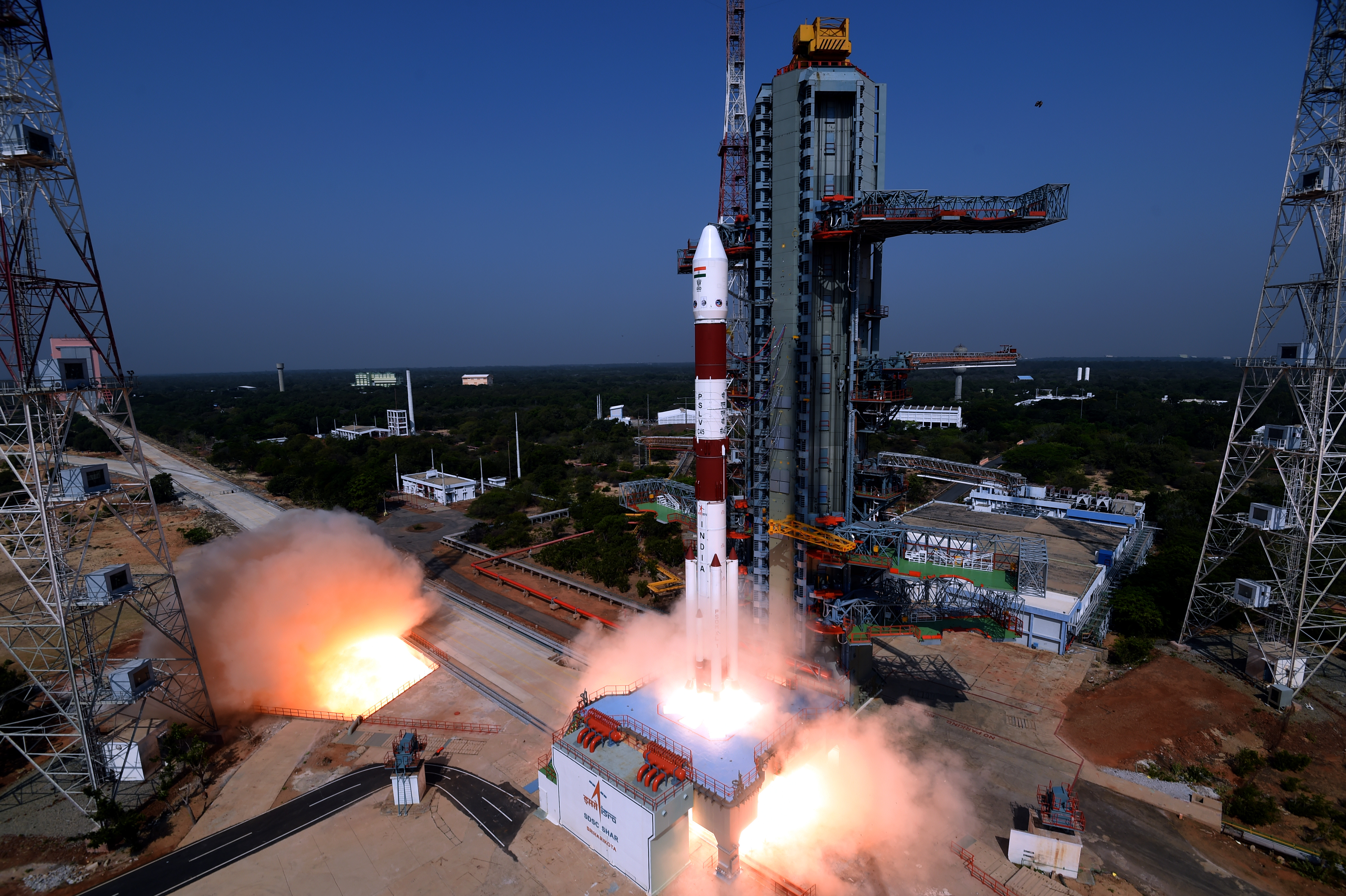
- Ignition of the PSLV-QL launch vehicle at the start of flight C45

PSLV-QL launch
- Launch: 1 April 2019, 03:57:00 UTC
- Operator: DRDO
- Pad: Sriharikota Second
- Payload: 29 satellites: Aistechsat-3; Astrocast-2; BlueWalker1; Doves × 20 (Flock 4a); EMISAT; Lemur-2 × 4; M6P
- Outcome: Success

PSLV launches

The PSLV-C45 is the 47th mission of the Indian Polar Satellite Launch Vehicle (PSLV) program. The Polar Satellite Launch Vehicle (PSLV)-C45 was launched on 1 April 2019 with a payload of 29 satellites, including one for electronic intelligence, along with 28 customer satellites from other countries.

== Details ==
The PSLV-C45 was launched from the second launch pad of the Satish Dhawan Space Centre in Sriharikota, Andhra Pradesh, India. The PSLV C45 rocket carried primary payloads like EMISAT and secondary payloads like M6P, BlueWalker 1, four Lemur-2 out of a total of thirty satellites. EMISAT is developed by DRDO. The EMISAT satellite is based on the IMS-2 bus inherited from SARAL. The nature of the payload has not been officially confirmed.

It was the first flight of PSLV-QL, having 4 strap-on boosters and placed a primary payload EMISAT and a secondary payload of multiple cubesats, for example 4 Lemur-2 satellites and the M6P satellite, in Sun-synchronous orbits.

== Uniqueness of the project ==
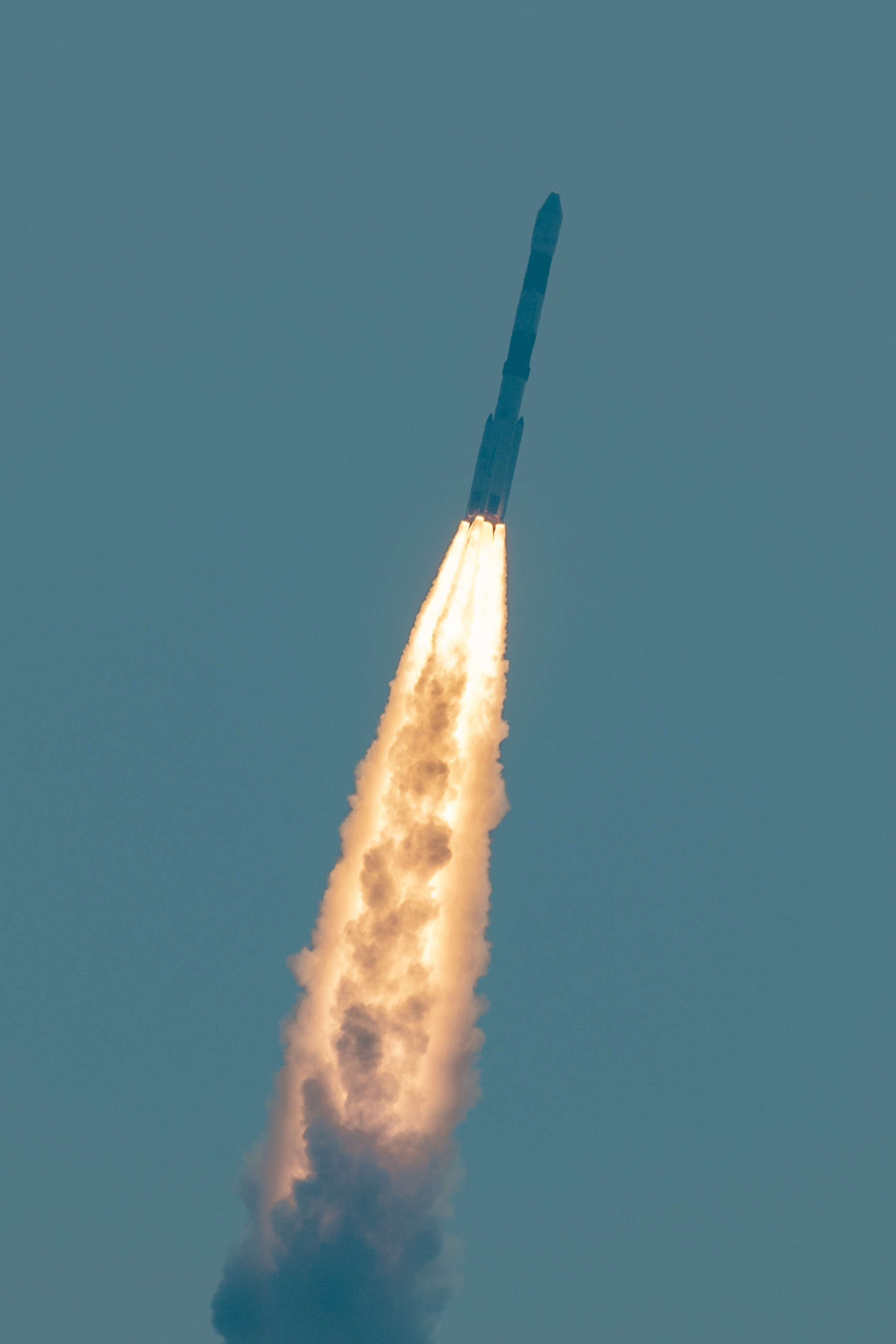
PSLV C45 as seen from launch view gallery

The specialty of this mission is that for the first time PSLV will launch satellites in Three different orbits. Another distinguished feature of the project is for the first time, PSLV with four strap-on configuration has been identified for this mission. Until now, PSLV has been in either two or six strap-on configuration or without any strap-ons. it is also the first PSLV to have fourth stage (PS4) that uses solar panels to support payloads hosted on it, seen as a precursor to the PSLV Orbital Experiment Module.

== Sequence of launch ==
Mission starts with the injection of the satellite EMISAT into orbit at 780 km, then it will inject 29 satellites into orbit at 504 km and later the fourth stage will move to 485 km orbit to carry out scientific experiments.

The launch was originally scheduled for 21 March 2019, but was delayed to 1 April "to ensure system readiness for a perfect launch".

== Mission overview ==
- Propellant:
  - Stage 1: composite solid
  - Stage 2: Earth storable liquid
  - Stage 3: composite solid
  - Stage 4: Earth storable liquid
- Altitude: 780 kilometres (485 mi)

The PSLV C45 rocket had four stages; each one was self-contained, with its own propulsion system, thereby capable of functioning independently. The first and third stages used composite solid propellants, while the second stage used earth-storable liquid propellant and fourth one fitted with Solar Panels.
