= PSLV-C53 =

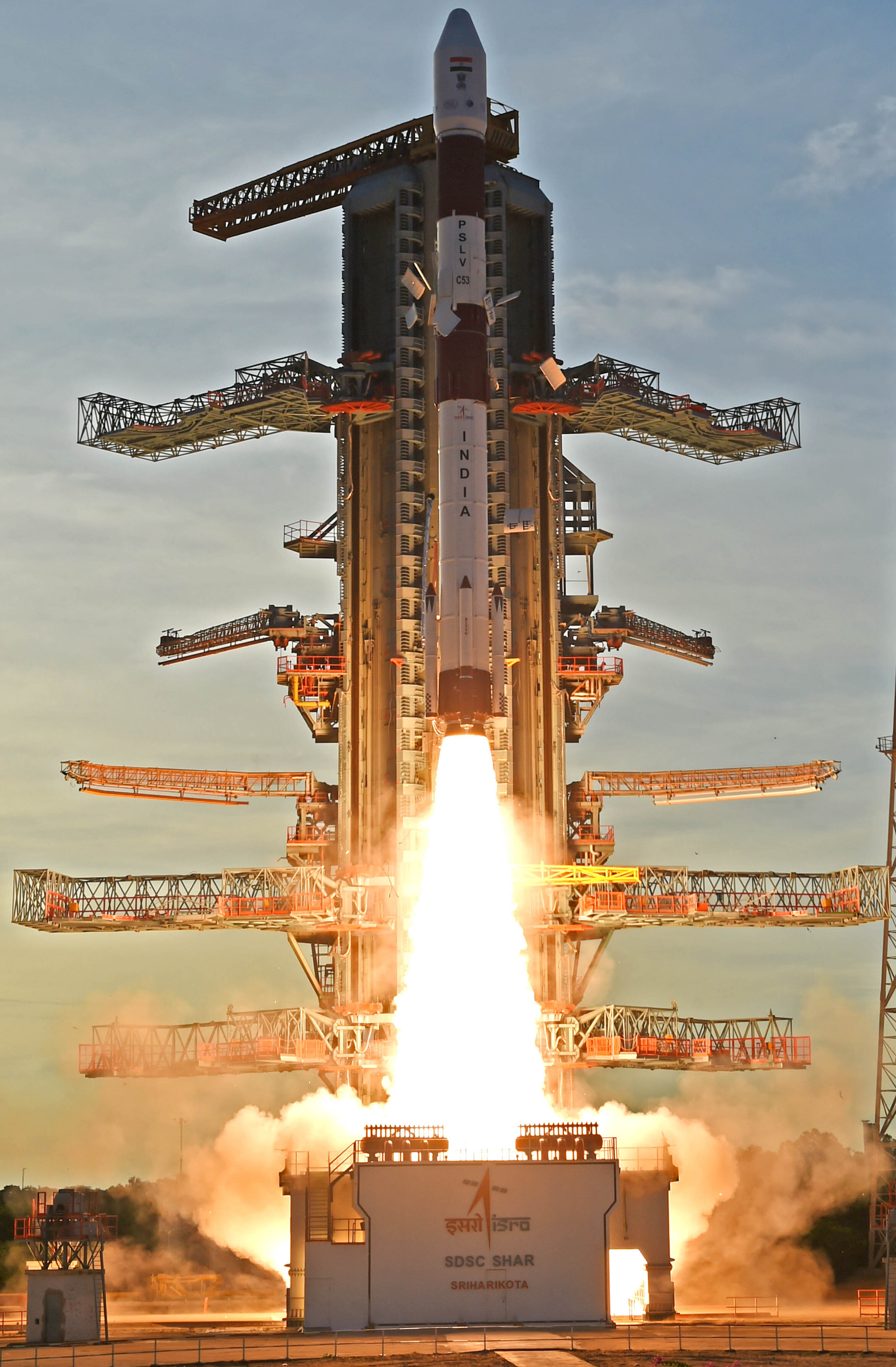
- PSLV-C53/DS-EO lifting off from Second Launch Pad of SDSC-SHAR on 30 June 2022.

PSLV-CA launch
- Launch: 30 June 2022; 12:32 (UTC)
- Pad: Satish Dhawan Space Centre
- Payload: (Singapore) DS-EO (Singapore) NeuSAR (Singapore) SCOOB-1 (India) 6× Smaller payloads hosted on POEM-1 (PSLV Orbital Experimental Module-1)

PSLV launches

The PSLV-C53 is the 55th mission of the Polar Satellite Launch Vehicle (PSLV) and 15th mission using PSLV-Core Alone variant. PSLV-C53 is the second commercial mission of NSIL.

== Details ==
The PSLV-C53 will be launched in its Core Alone configuration from the Second Launch Pad of the Satish Dhawan Space Centre in Sriharikota, Andhra Pradesh, India. It will carry three primary payloads DS-EO, NeuSAR and SCOOB-1.

DS-EO satellite (365 kg) is an Electro-Optic, multi-spectral satellite with 0.5 m (1 ft 8 in) resolution imaging capability for Defence Science and Technology Agency, Singapore. NeuSAR (155 kg) is first Singaporean small commercial satellite with a SAR payload.

=== PSLV Orbital Experimental Module ===
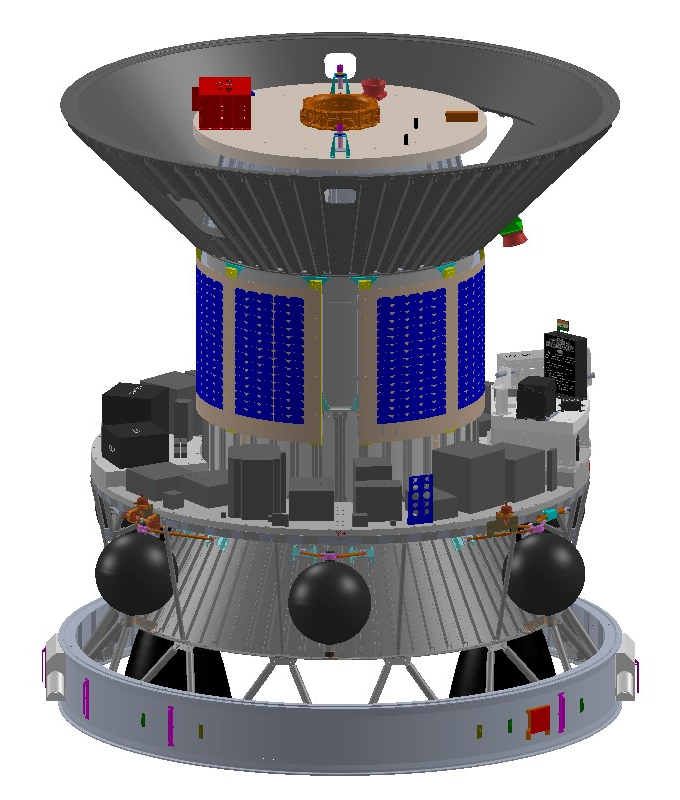
Render of PSLV Orbital Experimental Module (POEM) aka PS4 Orbital Platform without Dual Launch Adapter (upper)

The PSLV Orbital Experiment Module (POEM) also known as PS4 Orbital Platform (PS4-OP) utilizes the spent PSLV fourth stage (PS4) to provide a long duration in-orbit platform for hosting payloads. This would be first time that such PS4 based orbital platform would orbit the Earth as an actively stabilized platform post completion of main mission. Attitude stabilization is done using eight Helium based cold gas thrusters and a dedicated NGC system. Previously on PSLV C45 mission the PS4-OP was put in spin-stabilized mode using RCS thrusters of fourth stage.

For power generation and storage, POEM has solar panels mounted around the propellant tank of PS4 and a Li-Ion battery. Additionally four Sun sensors, a magnetometer, gyros and NavIC are used for navigation. POEM also has its own telecommand package.

POEM hosts six payloads including two from Indian aerospace start-ups enabled though NSIL and IN-SPACe. Five of those were mentioned in press-kit.

- DSOD-1U Small satellite deployer by Dhruva Space
- ROBI (ROBust Integrating proton fluence metre) by Digantara Research and Technologies
- Software Defined Radio based Telemetry Multi-Media Transmitter (SDRT-MTx)
- UHF Transmitter
- OP-VIS - Configured with one GVIS and two cameras

POEM is also carrying preamble to the Constitution of India bearing Indian flag.

== Launch schedule ==
Flight serial 'C53' was earlier assigned to EOS-06/Oceansat-3 satellite from March 2021 to at least April 2022 but was later given to DS-EO campaign.

Launch of PSLV-C53 was launched at 12:32 (UTC) on 30 June 2022 from Second Launch Pad at Satish Dhawan Space Centre, Sriharikota.
