= Indian Mini Satellite bus =

Satellite bus

Indian Mini Satellite (IMS) is a family of modular mini satellite buses developed by the Indian Space Research Organisation (ISRO).

== Variants ==
Indian Mini Satellite (Variants)
Feature	IMS-1	IMS-2	IMS-3 (Planned IMS-2 Derivative)
Launch Mass	100 kilograms (220 lb)	450 kilograms (990 lb)	450 kilograms (990 lb)
Maximum bus mass	70 kilograms (150 lb)	250 kilograms (550 lb)	250 kilograms (550 lb)
Payload mass	30 kilograms (66 lb)	200 kilograms (440 lb)	200 kilograms (440 lb)
Propellant	3.5 kilograms (7.7 lb)	21 kilograms (46 lb)	
Design lifetime	2 years	5 years	
Raw bus voltage	28-33 Volts	28-33 Volts	28-42 Volts
Solar Array Power	330 Watts (EOL)	675 Watts (EOL); 850 Watts (BOL)	850 Watts (BOL)
Payload power	30 Watts (Continuous); 70 Watts (Duty Cycle)	250 Watts (Continuous); 600 Watts (Duty Cycle)	250 Watts (Continuous); 400 Watts (Duty Cycle)
Attitude Control	3-axis stabilized Four Reaction Wheels; Single 1N thruster	3-axis stabilized Four Reaction Wheels; Mono-propellant RCS; Four 1N thrusters Four 0.2N thrusters	
Pointing Accuracy	±0.1° (3σ) (all axes)	± 0.1° (all axes)	± 0.1° (all axes)
SSR Storage	32 Gb	32 Gb (SDRAM); 256 Gb (Flash Memory)	32 Gb (SDRAM); 256 Gb (Flash Memory)
Payload data storage	≤ 16 Gb	≤ 32 Gb	
Downlink	≤ 8 Mbit/s DL rate	≤ 105 Mbit/s DL rate	≤ 160 Mbit/s DL rate
Missions	1. IMS-1; 2. Youthsat; 3. Microsat-TD; 4. SDX01 & SDX02	1. SARAL; 2. ScatSat-1; 3. EMISAT; 4. HySIS; 5. XPoSat	
Missions	IMS-1		

== See also ==
- Comparison of satellite buses
