= XPoSat =

Indian space observatory

X-ray Polarimeter Satellite
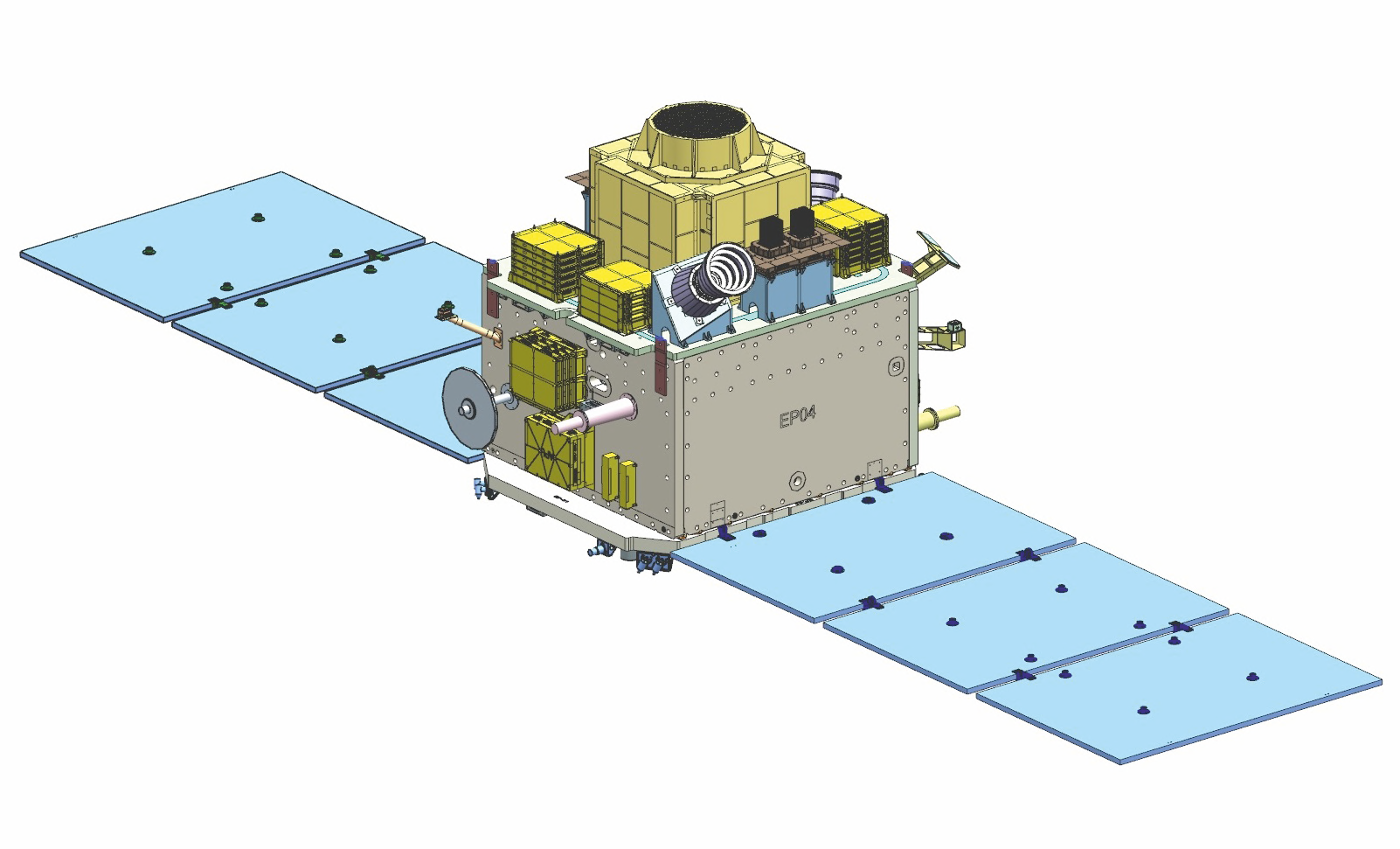
- X-ray Polarimeter satellite (XPoSat) in deployed configuration
- Names: XPoSat
- Mission type: X-ray polarimetry
- Operator: ISRO
- COSPAR ID: 2024-001A
- SATCAT no.: 58694
- Website: www.isro.gov.in/XPoSat.html
- Mission duration: Planned : 5 years Elapsed : 2 years, 8 months, 21 days

Spacecraft properties
- Spacecraft: X-ray Polarimeter Satellite
- Bus: Modified IMS-2
- Manufacturer: Raman Research Institute; U R Rao Satellite Centre
- Launch mass: 480 kg (1,060 lb)
- Payload mass: 144 kg (317 lb)
- Dimensions: 65 × 65 × 60 cm (26 × 26 × 24 in)
- Power: 1260 watts

Start of mission
- Launch date: 1 January 2024, 9:10 AM IST (3:40 UTC)
- Rocket: PSLV-DL
- Launch site: Satish Dhawan Space Centre First Launch Pad
- Contractor: ISRO

Orbital parameters
- Reference system: Geocentric orbit
- Regime: Low Earth orbit
- Perigee altitude: 638 km
- Apogee altitude: 653 km
- Inclination: 6°
- Period: 97.61 minutes

Instruments
- Polarimeter Instrument in X-rays (POLIX); X-ray Spectroscopy and Timing (XSPECT)
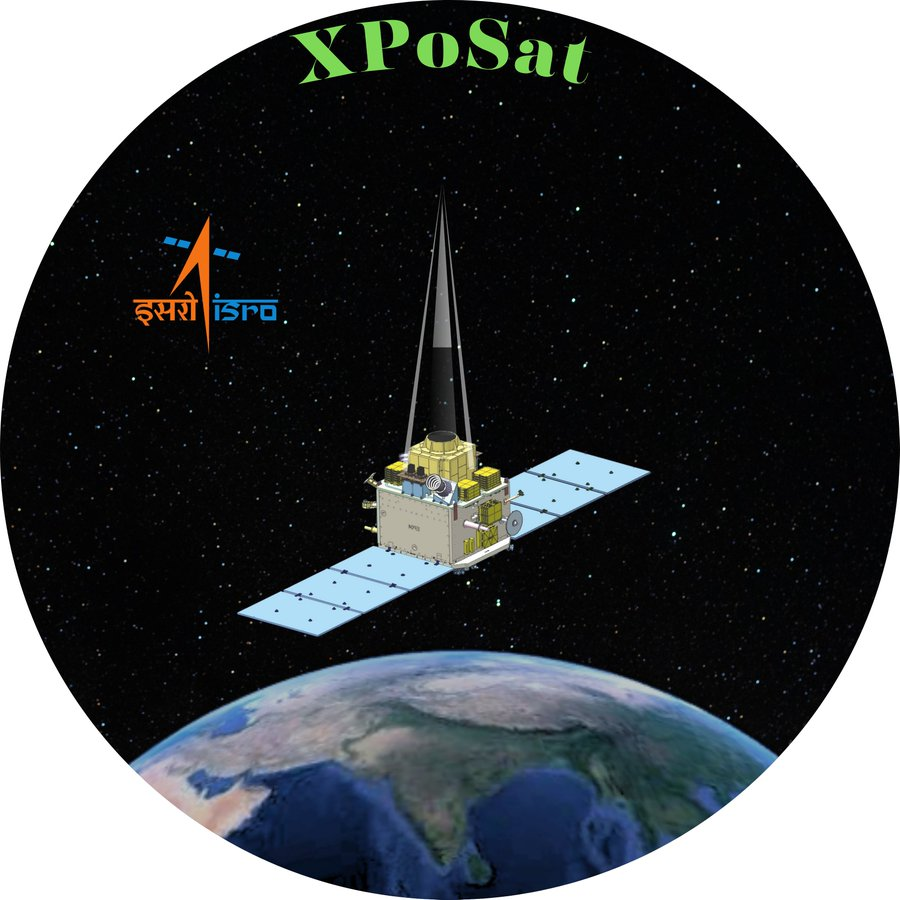
- XPoSat Logo

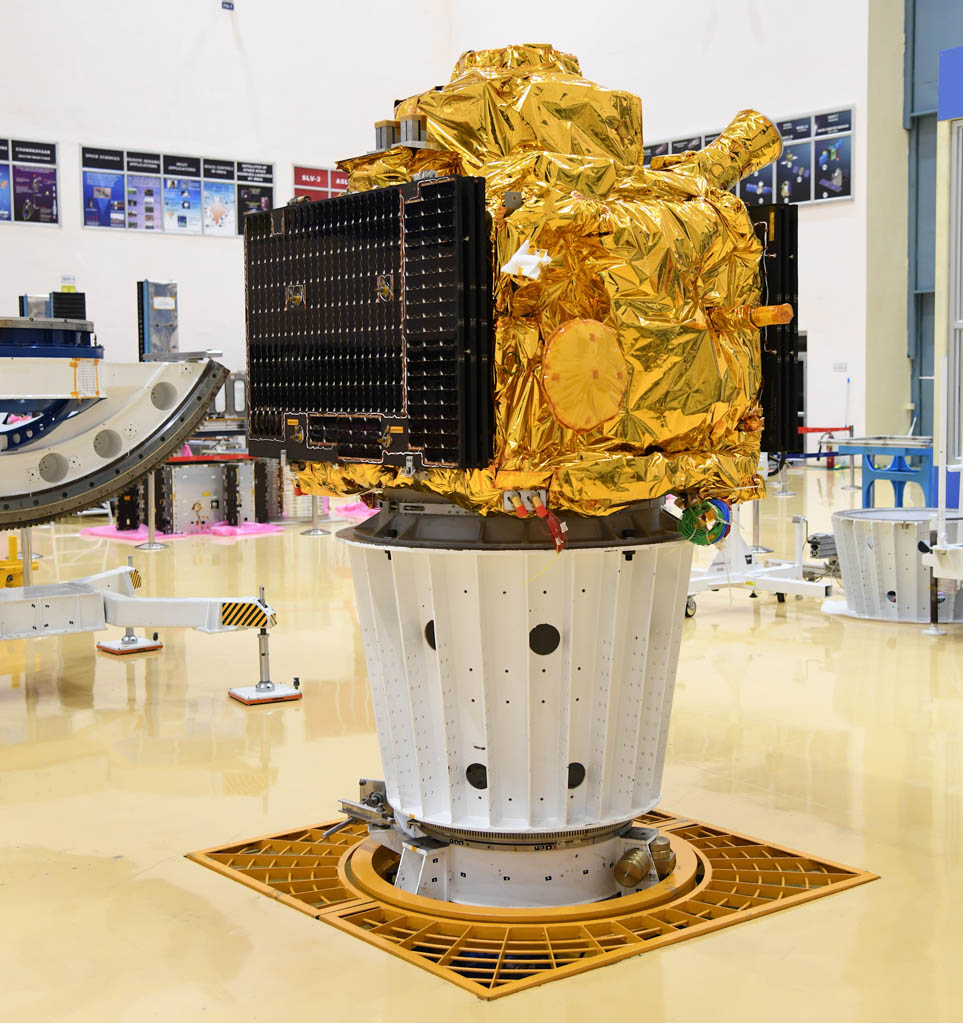
XPoSat being tested on Earth

The X-ray Polarimeter Satellite (XPoSat) is an ISRO-manufactured space observatory to study polarisation of cosmic X-rays. It was launched on 1 January 2024 on a PSLV rocket, and it has an expected operational lifespan of at least five years.

The telescope was developed by the Raman Research Institute (RRI) in close collaboration with the U R Rao Satellite Centre (URSC). Per ISRO, this mission will complement the efforts of US space agency NASA, which launched its Imaging X-ray Polarimetry Explorer (IXPE) in 2021 by observing space events across a broad energy range of 2–30 keV.

== Overview ==
Studying how radiation is polarised gives away the nature of its source, including the strength and distribution of its magnetic fields and the nature of other radiation around it. XPoSat will study the 50 locally brightest (known) sources in the universe consisting of, variously, pulsars, black hole X-ray binaries, active galactic nuclei, neutron stars and non-thermal supernova remnants. The observatory was placed in a circular low Earth orbit of 500–700 km (310–430 mi). The payloads onboard XPoSat will observe the X-Ray sources during its transit through the Earth's eclipse period.

== History ==
The XPoSat project began in September 2017 with the Indian Space Research Organisation (ISRO) grant of ₹95,000,000 ($133,100). Preliminary Design Review (PDR) of the XPoSat including the POLIX payload was completed in September 2018, followed by preparation of POLIX Qualification Model and beginning of some of its Flight Model components fabrication.

=== Launch ===
XPoSAT was successfully launched aboard the PSLV-C58 on 1 January 2024 at 9:10 am IST. The launch was precise, leaving only a deviation of (±) 3 km. Following the launch, the final 4th stage of the PSLV dropped to a 350 x 350 km orbit to facilitate its use as the PSLV Orbital Experimental Module POEM-3.

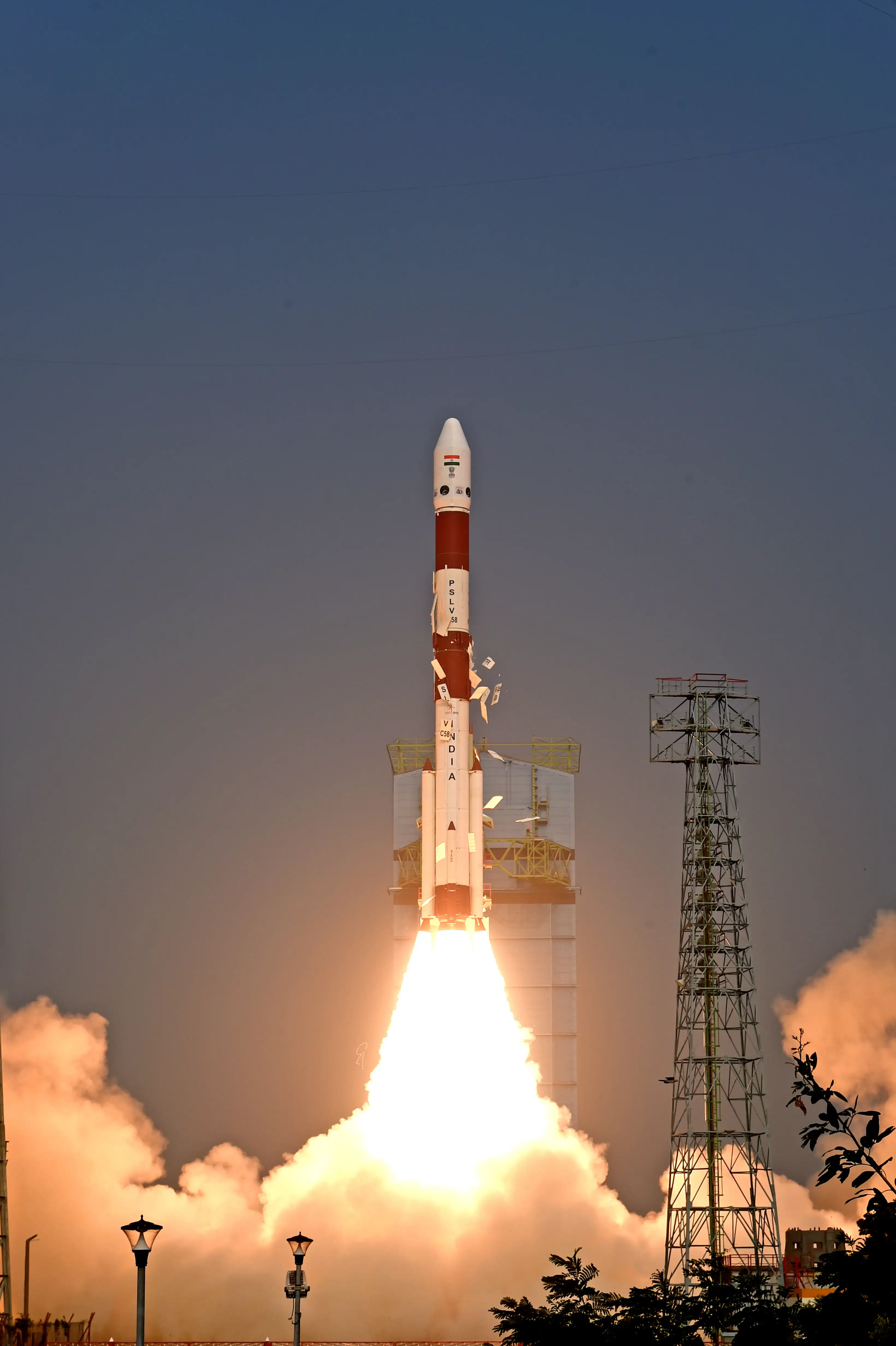
Launch of PSLV C-58 with XpoSAT and other hosted payloads

== Payloads ==
Two payloads of XPoSat are hosted on a modified IMS-2 satellite bus. Primary scientific payload is Polarimeter Instrument in X-rays (POLIX) to study the degree and angle of polarisation of about 50 locally brightest astronomical X-ray sources of different types during its mission in the energy range 8-30 keV. POLIX, a 125 kg (276 lb) instrument, was developed by the Raman Research Institute.

=== Polarimeter Instrument in X-rays (POLIX) ===
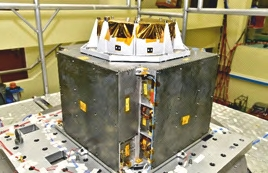
POLIX

POLIX is the primary scientific payload aboard XPoSat. It is a Thomson X-ray polarimeter, which measures the degree and angle of polarization (polarimetry parameters) of astronomical sources in the medium X-ray range (8-30 keV). It has been developed by the Raman Research Institute.

Its science objectives are to measure:

- the strength and the distribution of magnetic field in the sources
- geometric anisotropies in the sources
- their alignment with respect to the line of sight
- the nature of the accelerator responsible for energising the electrons taking part in radiation and scattering.

The experiment configuration consists of a collimator, central low Z (lithium, lithium hydride or beryllium) scatterer surrounded by xenon filled four X-ray proportional counters as X-ray detectors which collects the scattered X-ray photons. The instrument is rotated along the viewing axis leading to the measurement of the azimuthal distribution of the scattered X-ray photons which gives information on polarisation. Polarised X-rays will produce an azimuthal modulation in the count rate as opposed to uniform azimuthal distribution of count rate for unpolarised X-rays. POLIX has four independent detectors, each with its own front end and processing electronics. Localization of the X-ray photon in the detectors is carried out by the method of charge division in a set of resistive anode wires connected in series.

The prime objects for observation with this instrument are the X-ray bright accretion powered neutron stars, accreting black holes in different spectral states, rotation powered pulsars, magnetars, and active galactic nuclei. This instrument bridges an energy gap in detection capability, between the soft X-ray polarimeters utilising Bragg reflection (OSO-8) or Photoelectron tracks (IXPE), and hard X-ray polarimeters using Compton scattering such as the Cadmium Zinc Telluride Imager (CZTI) on AstroSat.

=== X-ray Spectroscopy and Timing (XSPECT) ===
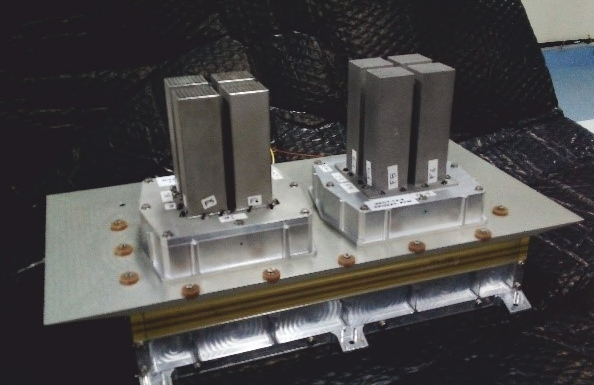
XSPECT

XSPECT is the secondary payload on XPoSat. It measures spectroscopic and timing information of soft X-rays generated by celestial X-ray sources. XSPECT is designed to pursue timing studies of soft X-rays (0.8-15 keV), complementary to what the Large Area X-ray Proportional Counter (LAXPC) does at high energies on AstroSat, while simultaneously providing adequate spectral resolution in the 0.8-15 keV band. It has an energy resolution of <200 eV at 5.9 keV (-20 °C) and a timing resolution of ~2 msec. It has been developed by the Space Astronomy Group of the U R Rao Satellite Centre.

The detector achieves modest effective area without the use of focusing optics using the large area Swept Charge Devices (SCD), a variant of X-ray charge-coupled Devices (CCDs). SCDs permit fast readouts (10–100 kHz) and moderately good spectral resolution at the cost of a position sensitivity. These devices are unique in requiring very benign cooling requirement (requiring only passive cooling) unlike traditional X-ray CCDs.

Key science objectives of XSPECT include understanding long-term behavior of X-ray sources through correlation of timing characteristics with spectral state changes and emission line variations.

== Science ==
=== First Light ===
==== XSPECT ====
The XSPECT payload on XPoSat captured its first light from the Cassiopeia A (Cas A), a supernova remnant somewhat over 11,000 light years away on 5 January 2024. During its performance verification phase, XSPECT was directed towards this standard celestial source used for instrument evaluation which is among the brightest radio frequency sources in the sky. The observation commenced on 5 January 2024, capturing the supernova remnant's emission lines corresponding to elements such as magnesium, silicon, sulphur, argon, calcium, and iron.

==== POLIX ====
XPoSat's POLIX sensor has started making scientific observations including first-ever data of x-ray polarisation of the Crab Pulsar, its first subject. The observation, which verified the POLIX instrument's operation, took place between 15 and 18 January 2024. POLIX monitored this fast-spinning neutron star in the Crab Nebula that releases roughly thirty X-ray pulses per second. Through the identification of polarization in its incoming X-rays, POLIX provides fresh perspectives on the physical emission processes at the surface of neutron stars. On 10 January 2024, the instrument was gradually turned on.

=== Solar observations ===
In response to a massive Solar flare in May 2024, XpoSAT, along with Aditya-L1 and the Chandrayaan-2 Orbiter collected data on the event. XSPECT was used in conjunction with data from ground based observatories to provide fast timed and good spectroscopic results in the X-Ray spectra.

=== Astronomical observations ===
On 19 March 2025, the XSPECT instrument detected a rare thermonuclear "burst" peaking in just a few seconds and fading over about 20 seconds, followed about 16 minutes later by a much longer and more powerful event called a "superburst" from a neutron star system named 4U 1608-52, located about 4,000 light-years from Earth. XSPECT’s detailed observations showed the neutron star’s surface temperature during the bursts reached around 20 million degrees Kelvin, with a radius close to 9.3 kilometers.The data also suggest special processes like Compton scattering might be involved in the superburst’s high brightness and slow fade. The superburst was also observed by the MAXI telescope on the ISS.

=== Release of Data ===
ISRO released the first tranche of XpoSAT data to the public on 13 October 2025, during a national-level organisational meet.The maiden Datasets release contained over 134GB of data and was followed by an appraisal of the mission.

== See also ==
- Imaging X-ray Polarimetry Explorer
- List of X-ray space telescopes
- X-ray astronomy satellite
- X-ray telescope
