= PSLV Orbital Experiment Module =

Satellite bus derived out of launch vehicle upper stage

PSLV Orbital Experimental Module
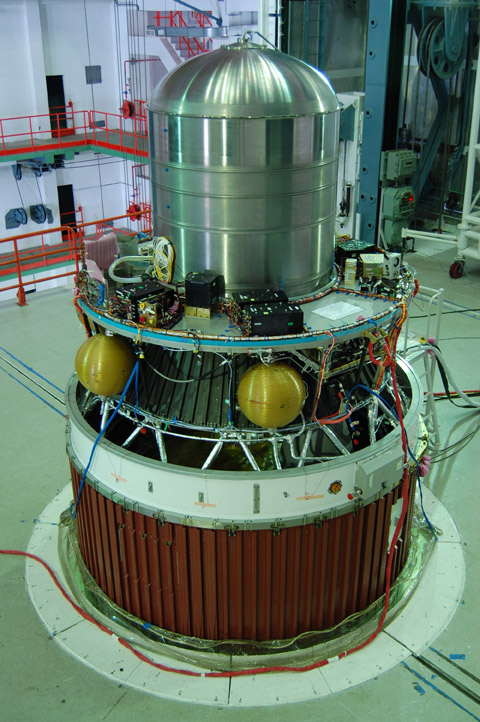
- Unmodified PSLV fourth stage for PSLV-C11 campaign.
- Names: PS4 Orbital Platform
- Mission type: Technology

Spacecraft properties
- Dry mass: ~920 kg
- Payload mass: up to 30 kg
- Dimensions: Length: 3 meter Diameter: 2 meter
- Power: 200 to 500 watts

PSLV Orbital Experiment Platform (POEM) also known as PSLV Stage 4 Orbital Platform (PS4-OP) is an orbital micro-gravity test bed based on spent fourth stage of PSLV. By adding modular subsystems for power generation, communication and stabilization like photovoltaic cells, Telemetry and Telecommand (TT&C) package, attitude control system, data storage etc to the PSLV fourth stage, it can function as a satellite bus. This augmented stage can then host payloads for up to six months while in orbit, making it useful for qualifying components, gaining space heritage and conduct experiments in micro-gravity conditions. Usually the fourth stage of PSLV is discarded after deployment of satellite and remains in orbit for a significant duration in a passive state as a piece of space debris.

== Objective ==
POEM or PS4-OP was conceived by VSSC/ISRO to help Indian academia and start-ups by providing a low cost platform with essential subsystems to support their payloads hence lowering the barriers of reaching orbit. POEM off-loads the burden of designing, qualifying, procuring a satellite bus, setting up a ground station etc. which reduces the development time and costs associated with using space-grade components thus allowing entities to just focus on payload.

== History ==
PSLV fourth stage or PS4 has often been used to carry non-separable payloads like AAM on PSLV-C8, Rubin 9.1/Rubin 9.2 on PSLV-C14 and mRESINS on PSLV-C21 etc. but such payloads could be supported only for a very short duration as PS4 lacked the capacity to generate power and maintain attitude stability. So it was proposed to augment PS4 with modular subsystems to convert it into a long duration orbital platform after completion of primary mission.

In 2017 as an early demonstration on PSLV-C37/Cartosat-2D and PSLV-C38/Cartosat-2E campaigns, PS4 was kept operational and monitored for over ten orbits after completion of its primary mission of deploying spacecraft. Fourth stage on PSLV-C38 hosted IDEA (Ionization Density and Electric field Analyzer) as a non-separable payload by Space Physics Laboratory of VSSC, two other non-separable payloads were mAMP and 'Earth Pointing Platform'.

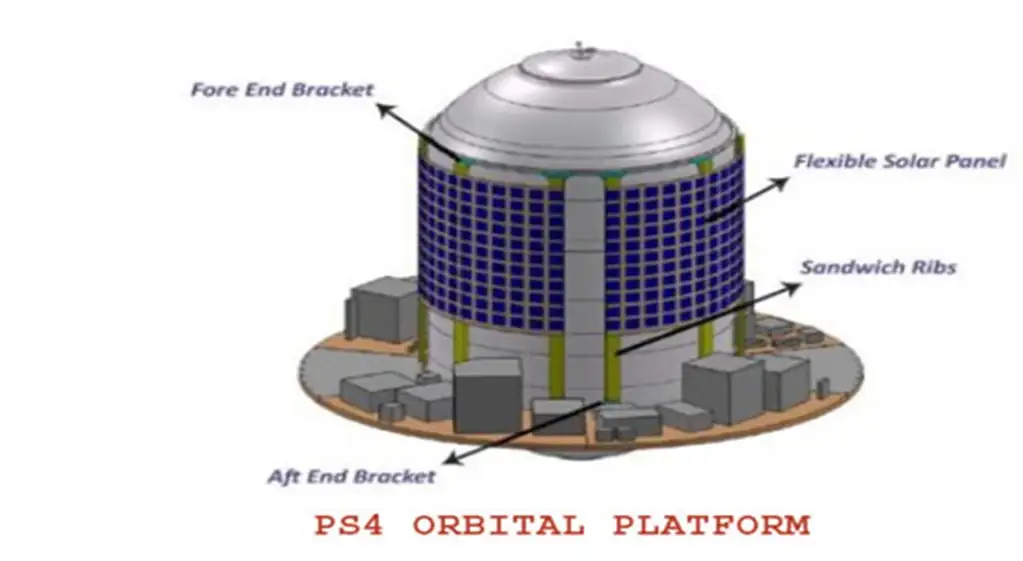
Render of PS4 Orbital Platform payload deck

In January 2019, PSLV-C44/Microsat-R became the first campaign where PS4 functioned as an independent orbital platform for short duration as the provisions for on-board power generation capacity were not yet made. It hosted a 1U cubesat called KalamSAT-V2 as a non-separable payload by Space Kidz India based on Interorbital Systems kit. Later in April, the fourth stage on PSLV-C45/EMISAT had its own power generation capacity as it was augmented with an array of fixed solar cells wrapped around the propellant tank of PS4 generating about 200 watts of power. Three payloads hosted on PS4-OP were, Advanced Retarding Potential Analyzer for Ionospheric Studies (ARIS 101F) by IIST, experimental AIS payload by ISRO and AISAT by Satellize. To function as an orbital platform, fourth stage was put in spin-stabilized mode using its RCS thrusters. PS4-OP on this campaign had mission life of 3 months and AISAT payload onboard was operational for almost a year. According to ISRO, the PS4-OP can transmit commands and data to sustain the payloads and regulate its location in three different orientations.

After these initial testing campaigns, ISRO issued an Announcement of Opportunity in June 2019 to carry out in-orbit scientific experiments on PS4 orbital platform. And in following years POEM-1 aboard PSLV-C53/DS-EO campaign in June 2022 and POEM-2 aboard PSLV-C55/TeLEOS-2 campaign in April 2023 were launched. Both of these orbital platforms had mature configurations utilizing 3-axis stabilization and on-board power generation capacity.

In July 2023, Indian National Space Promotion and Authorisation Centre (IN-SPACe) issued an announcement of opportunity inviting payloads to be hosted aboard upcoming POEM campaigns tentatively scheduled between November 2023 and June 2024.

On 1 January 2024, POEM-3 was launched along with XpoSat on PSLV-C58 hosting ten payloads. The stage was lowered from a 650 km (circular) injection orbit of XpoSAT to a 350 km circular orbit for POEM-3 operations. POEM-3 re-entered atmosphere on 21 March 2024 over the Pacific Ocean after having accomplished its objectives by February and thus leaving behind no space-debris from the launch.

On 30 December 2024, POEM-4 was launched with 24 non-separable payloads as part of the PSLV-C60/SpaDeX mission. The PS4 stage was restarted twice to lower the orbit from 470 km to 350 km circular orbit for POEM-4 operations.

== Platform capabilities ==
Specifications and capabilities of PSLV fourth stage based orbital platform which may improve over time.

- Mission life: Up to six months depending on left-over Helium pressurant in fourth stage.
- Maximum mass of payload: 30 kg
- Maximum size: About 3U, depends on spare area available for a particular mission and mounting location.
- Maximum power of payload: 200 to 500 watts
- Power bus: 28 Volts
- Maximum data rate: 1 Mbps
- Pointing accuracy:
  - During sunlit period: within ±1°
  - During eclipse: ±5°
  - Slew rate within 0.5° per second during stabilized regime.
- Data storage: 1GB
- TT&C: S-band
- Downlink at ISRO ground station
- Suitable for experiments requiring large Inertia and structure.

== Missions ==
As of February 2025, the POEM module has been used on Four missions;

1. PSLV-C53/POEM-1
2. PSLV-C55/POEM-2
3. PSLV-C58/POEM-3
4. PSLV-C60/POEM-4

== Gallery ==
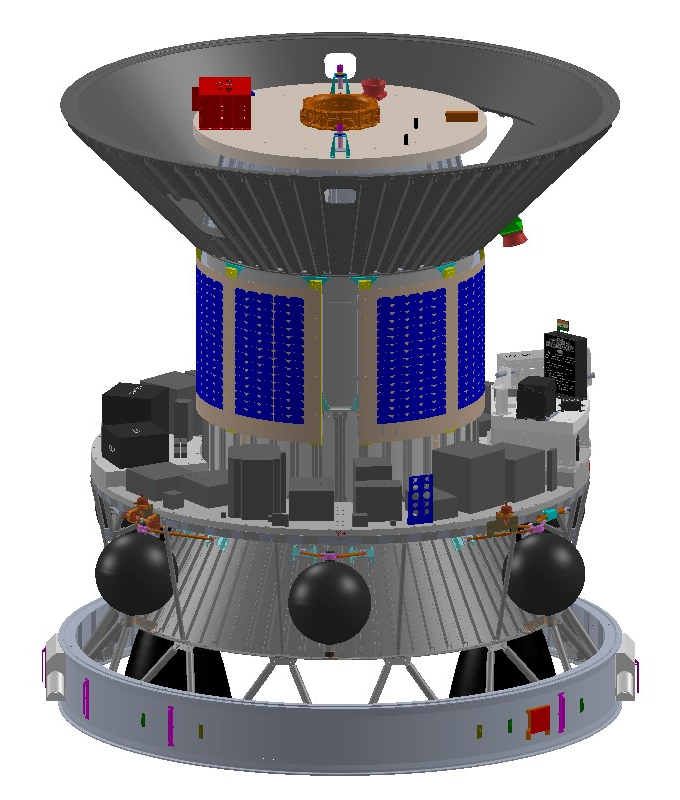
PSLV-C53/POEM-1

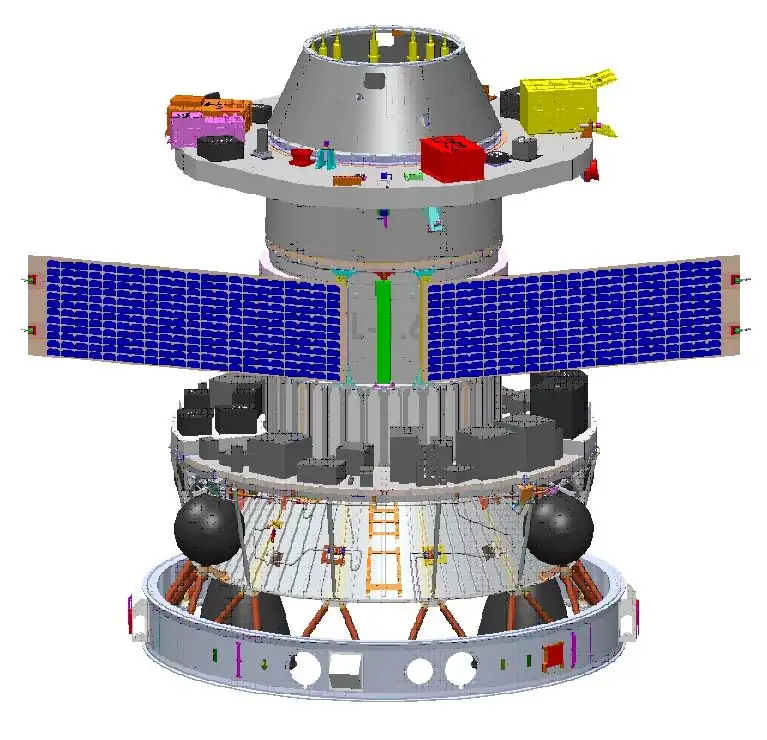
PSLV-C55/POEM-2

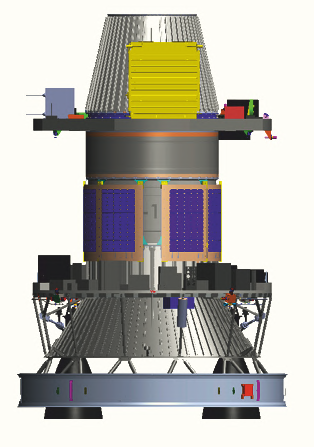
PSLV-C58/POEM-3

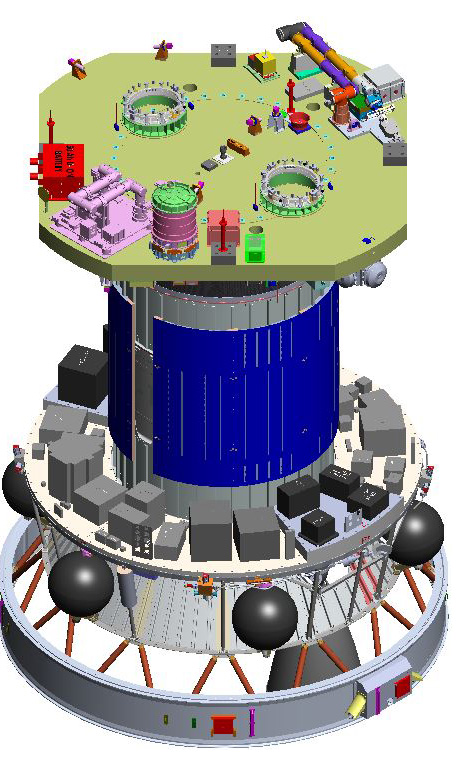
PSLV-C60/POEM-4

== See also ==
- RM-81 Agena
- Rocket Lab Photon
- Comparison of satellite buses
