= LBS Centre for Science and Technology =

Indian research institute

The LBS Centre for Science and Technology (LBSCS&T) is an autonomous body established in 1976 by the Government of Kerala, India. The Centre facilitates communication between educational institutions and the government. Another objective in setting up the centre was establishing and running institutions of technical education in Kerala. The head offices of the centre are at Nandavanam, Palayam, Thiruvananthapuram. Currently the centre has five regional units located at Kollam, Kalamassery, Thrissur, Kozhikode and Kannur.

== Institutions maintained by LBSCS&T ==
The centre maintains the following institutions:

- Centre for Disability Studies, Poojappura, Thiruvananthapuram
- LBS Model Degree College, Parappanangadi, Malappuram
- L B S Institute of Technology for Women, Poojappura, Thiruvananthapuram
