= EOS-09 =

Indian radar imaging satellite

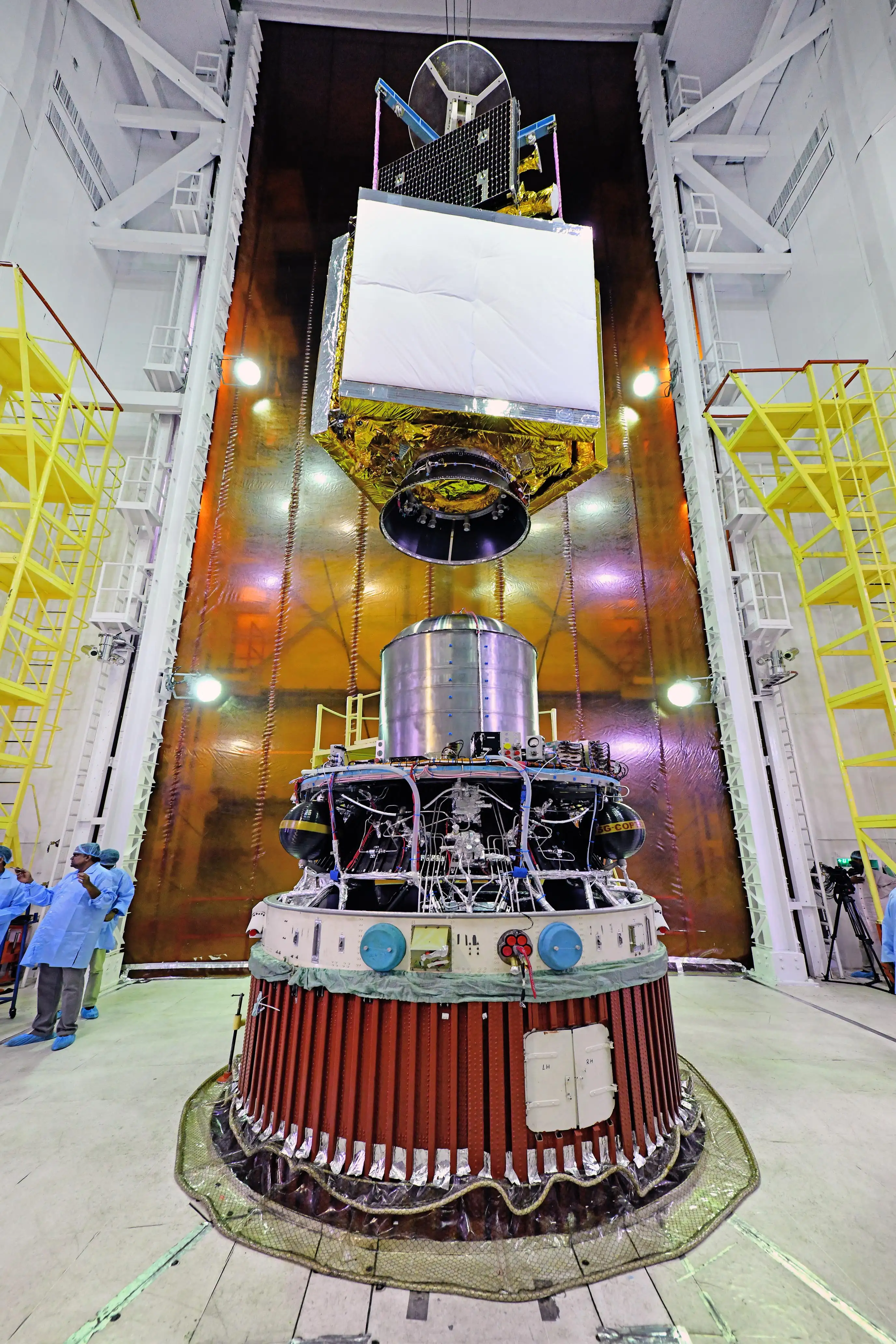
- EOS-9 during Integration
- Names: Radar Imaging Satellite-1B
- Mission type: Imaging radar
- Operator: ISRO
- Website: ISRO PSLV-C61 / EOS-09 Mission
- Mission duration: 5 years (planned); Failed to orbit

Spacecraft properties
- Spacecraft: EOS-09
- Manufacturer: ISRO

Start of mission
- Launch date: 18 May 2025, 05:59 IST
- Rocket: PSLV-C61
- Launch site: Satish Dhawan Space Centre, First Launch Pad (FLP)
- Contractor: ISRO

Orbital parameters
- Reference system: Geocentric orbit
- Regime: Sun-synchronous orbit
- Perigee altitude: 526.7 km (327.3 mi) (planned)
- Apogee altitude: 543.4 km (337.7 mi) (planned)
- Inclination: 97.6°
- Period: 95.2 minutes

Instruments
- Synthetic Aperture Radar (C-band) (SAR-C)

EOS-09 or Earth Observation Satellite-09 was an Indian radar imaging satellite developed by the Indian Space Research Organisation as a follow-on to RISAT-1. It carried a C-band synthetic aperture radar capable of observing Earth regardless of lighting and weather conditions. The satellite was designed to provide remote sensing data for various operational applications and complement observations from other Indian Earth-observation satellites. Its launch aboard the PSLV-C61 on 18 May 2025 failed after an anomaly occurred during the rocket's third stage, preventing the satellite from reaching orbit.

== Satellite description ==
Synthetic Aperture Radar (SAR) can be used for Earth observation irrespective of the light and weather conditions of the area being imaged. It complements/supplements data from Resourcesat, Cartosat and RISAT-2B Series. The satellite carries a C-band synthetic-aperture radar (SAR) and has a liftoff mass of 1,710 kg (3,770 lb). The EOS-09 orbit is expected to be in a polar and Sun-synchronous orbit (SSO) at 05:30 AM LTDN, at approximate altitude of 529 km.

== Launch Failure ==
The PSLV-C61 mission launched EOS-9 on 18 May 2025 at 5:59 AM IST was the 63rd flight of PSLV, 27th in its XL configuration and was ISRO's 101st launch. The first and second stages performed nominally, however, the third stage experienced an anomaly which resulted in loss of mission. ISRO Chairman V. Narayanan later confirmed that the anomaly involved a drop in combustion chamber pressure during the third stage's operation.

The satellite had five imaging modes, ranging from ultra-high-resolution imaging for detecting small objects to wide scans of large areas, and was expected to improve border monitoring and disaster response; it was scheduled to launch amid tensions on the India–Pakistan border. The spent fourth stage was to be lowered with orbit change thrusters and passivated after the mission. After the failure, reports said a drop in chamber pressure in the third stage during its firing caused the loss.

ISRO's failure analysis committee submitted its report to the Prime Minister's Office in August 2025, and ISRO's chairman said the PSLV would return to flight within three months. Components of the third stage, HPS3, were redesigned, and the modified stage completed two static tests, on 6 October and 19 November 2025. The detailed report was not published before the next PSLV launch, PSLV-C62 in January 2026, which also failed during the third stage and lost the EOS-N1 satellite.

== See also ==
- PSLV-C61
- List of Indian satellites
- ISRO
- RISAT
- PSLV
