= EOS-01 =

Indian Earth observation satellite

- Names: RISAT-2BR2; Earth Observation Satellite-01
- Mission type: Radar imaging Earth observation satellite
- Operator: ISRO
- COSPAR ID: 2020-081A
- SATCAT no.: 46905
- Website: https://www.isro.gov.in
- Mission duration: 5 years (planned); 6 years and 14 days (in progress)

Spacecraft properties
- Spacecraft: EOS-01
- Bus: RISAT
- Manufacturer: Indian Space Research Organisation
- Launch mass: 615 kg (1,356 lb)
- Power: 2 kW

Start of mission
- Launch date: 7 November 2020, 09:41 UTC
- Rocket: PSLV-DL, PSLV-C49
- Launch site: Satish Dhawan Space Centre, First Launch Pad (FLP)
- Contractor: Indian Space Research Organisation
- Entered service: February 2021

Orbital parameters
- Reference system: Geocentric orbit
- Regime: Low Earth orbit
- Altitude: 555 km (345 mi)
- Inclination: 36.9°
- Period: 90.0 minutes

Instruments
- Synthetic Aperture Radar (X-band) (SAR-X)

EOS-01 (formerly known as RISAT-2BR2) is an X-band, synthetic-aperture radar (SAR) based all weather Earth imaging satellite built by the Indian Space Research Organisation (ISRO) for tasks pertaining to forestry, agricultural and disaster management. It is a part of India's RISAT series of SAR imaging spacecraft and would be third satellite in the series including RISAT-2B, RISAT-2BR1 with 120° phasing. EOS-01 has been developed at the cost of roughly ₹125 crore (equivalent to ₹161 crore or US$17 million in 2026).

== Launch ==
EOS-1 (RISAT-2BR2) has been launched on board a PSLV-DL PSLV-C49 launch vehicle on 7 November 2020 along with 9 foreign satellites. The satellite was although earlier scheduled for first half of 2020, impact of COVID-19 pandemic in India affected ISRO's activities and delayed a number of programs by months and it was first launch mission of ISRO in 2020. Due to fears of infections amid pandemic, gathering of staff and media were dismissed for this launch.

As per reports on 29 October 2020, RISAT-2BR2 was renamed as "EOS-01" per new naming criteria adopted by ISRO.

== See also ==
- RISAT
- List of Indian satellites
