= EOS-04 =

Indian radar imaging satellite

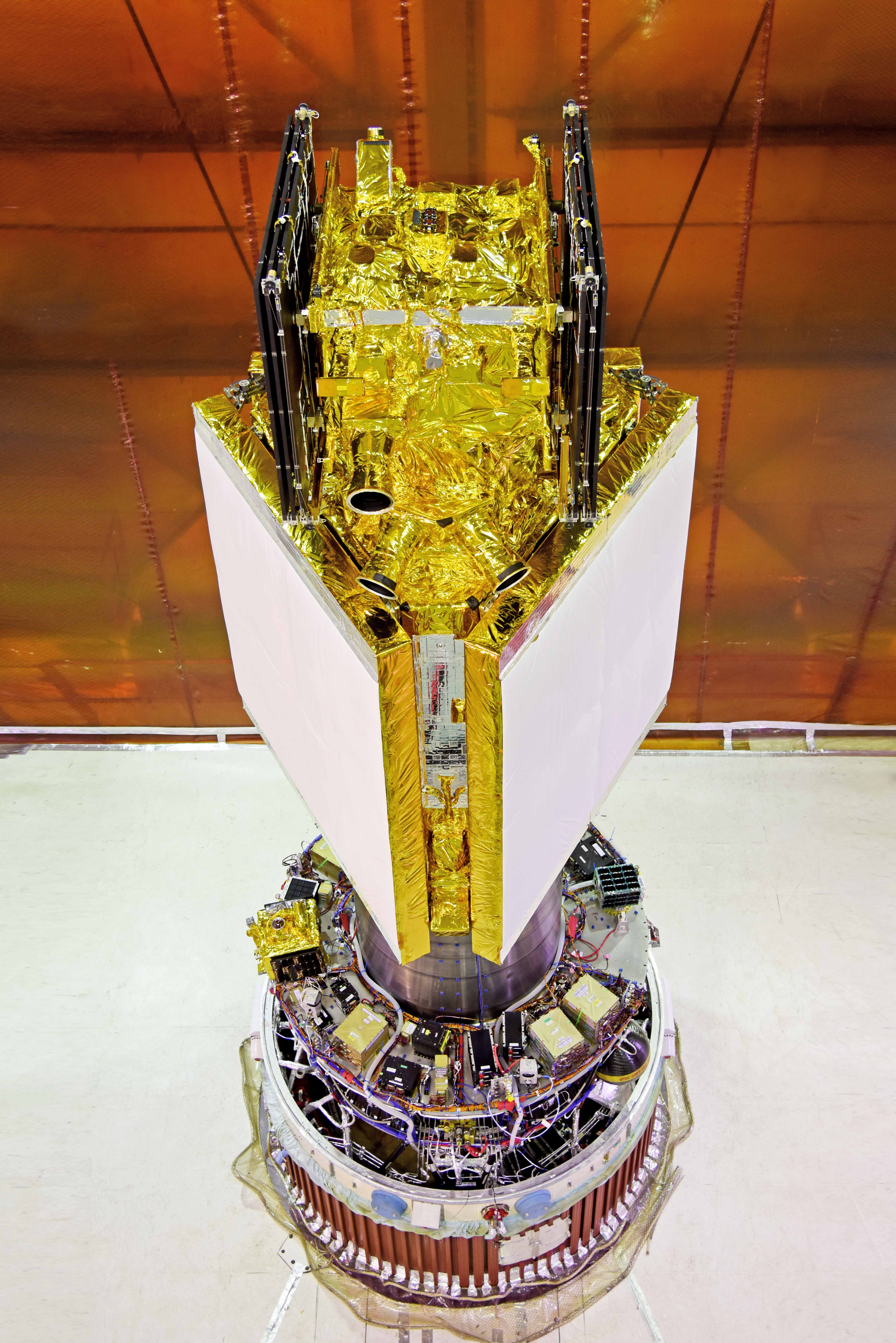
- EOS-04 Satellite
- Names: Radar Imaging Satellite-1A
- Mission type: Imaging radar
- Operator: ISRO
- COSPAR ID: 2022-013A
- SATCAT no.: 51656
- Website: www.isro.gov.in/launcher/pslv-c52-eos-04-mission
- Mission duration: 10 years (planned); 4 years, 9 months, 8 days (in progress)

Spacecraft properties
- Spacecraft: EOS-04
- Manufacturer: Indian Space Research Organisation
- Launch mass: 1,710 kg (3,770 lb)
- Power: 2280 watts

Start of mission
- Launch date: 14 February 2022, 00:29 UTC
- Rocket: PSLV-C52
- Launch site: Satish Dhawan Space Centre, First Launch Pad (FLP)
- Contractor: Indian Space Research Organisation

Orbital parameters
- Reference system: Geocentric orbit
- Regime: Sun-synchronous orbit
- Perigee altitude: 526.7 km (327.3 mi)
- Apogee altitude: 543.4 km (337.7 mi)
- Inclination: 97.6°
- Period: 95.2 minutes

Instruments
- Synthetic Aperture Radar (C-band) (SAR-C)

EOS-04, also known as Earth Observation Satellite-04, is an Indian radar imaging satellite developed by the Indian Space Research Organisation. It carries a C-band synthetic aperture radar (SAR) for Earth observation in all weather and lighting conditions. Its imaging capabilities complement data from the Resourcesat, Cartosat and RISAT-2B satellite series. The satellite provides different imaging resolutions and coverage widths, supporting applications such as systematic monitoring of India's land and coastal regions.

== Satellite description ==
Synthetic aperture radar can be used for Earth observation irrespective of the light and weather conditions of the area being imaged. It complements/supplements data from Resourcesat, Cartosat and RISAT-2B Series. The satellite carries a C-band synthetic-aperture radar (SAR) and has a liftoff mass of 1,710 kg (3,770 lb). The EOS-04 orbit is polar and Sun-synchronous at 06:00 AM LTDN, at approximate altitude of 529 km. Assembly Integration and Testing of spacecraft was done by a consortium led by Alpha Design Technologies Ltd. Approximate cost of EOS-04 is ₹490 crore (equivalent to ₹600 crore or US$64 million in 2026).

The SAR payload is an active phased array antenna of micro-strip design, 6 m by 2 m in size, built from three 2 m by 2 m panels and 288 transmit-receive modules, and operates at 5.35 GHz. It offers resolutions from 1 m to 50 m and swaths from 10 km to 223 km. Its modes are a high-resolution spotlight mode (1 m resolution, 15 km swath), two fine-resolution stripmap modes, FRS-1 and FRS-2, with a 3 m azimuth resolution and swaths of about 25 km, a medium-resolution ScanSAR mode with a 160 km swath and 33 m resolution, and a coarse-resolution ScanSAR mode with a 223 km swath and 50 m resolution. According to a Current Science, EOS-04 is the first payload to offer full-polarization imaging in both stripmap and wide-swath ScanSAR configurations, and its FRS-2 mode uses full polarization in place of the circular polarization of RISAT-1. Its medium-resolution mode is used for systematic coverage of India every 17 days, and researchers have used its data to estimate coastal bathymetry and to measure internal solitary waves in the ocean.

== Launch ==
EOS-04 was launched on the Polar Satellite Launch Vehicle (PSLV-C52) from First Launch Pad(FLP), SDSC, SHAR, Sriharikota at 05:59 hrs IST (00:29 hrs UTC) on 14 February 2022. It was launched along with two ridesharing satellites, INS-2TD a technology demonstrator by ISRO and INSPIREsat-1 a university satellite.

EOS-04 captured first images on 25 February 2022 after launch.

== See also ==
- RISAT
- PSLV
