= PSLV-C46 =

Polar satellite launch vehicle mission by ISRO

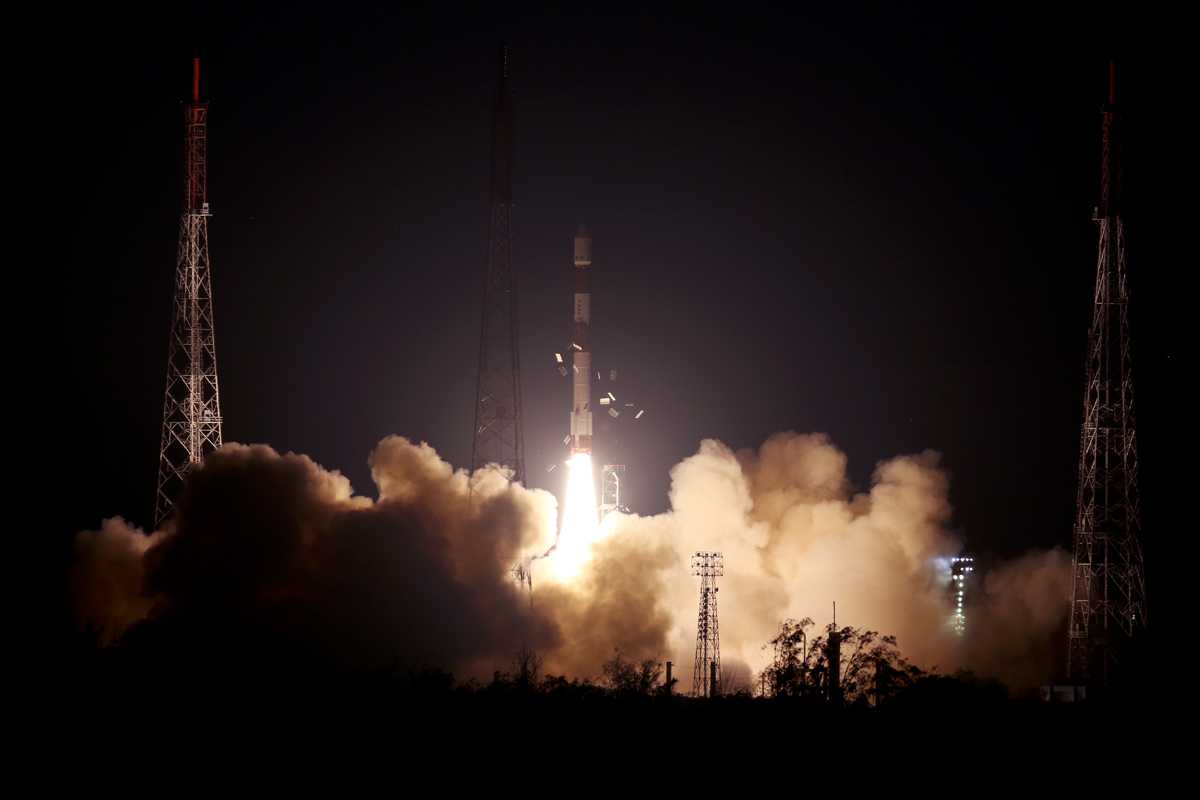

PSLV-CA launch
- Launch: 22 May 2019, 05:30:00 IST
- Operator: ISRO
- Pad: Sriharikota First
- Payload: RISAT-2B
- Outcome: Success

PSLV launches

PSLV-C46 was a mission of the Indian Polar Satellite Launch Vehicle (PSLV) rocket, launched on Thursday, May 22, 2019, at 05:30 Hrs (IST) by the Indian Space Research Organisation (ISRO) from the first launch pad of the Satish Dhawan Space Centre at Sriharikota, Andhra Pradesh. In this mission, the 'Core-Alone' configuration of PSLV was flown (without the use of solid strap-on motors).

The mission launched RISAT-2B into a Geocentric Sun-synchronous orbit. The satellite is an Indian radar reconnaissance satellite that is part of India's RISAT programme and is the third satellite in the series. The satellite was injected into an orbit of 555 km, 15 minutes and 30 seconds after lift-off, at an inclination of 37 degree to the equator.

== Launch ==
The mission was the 72nd launch mission from Satish Dhawan Space Centre, 36th from the first launch pad and the 48th flight of PSLV. It was also the 14th flight of the `Core alone' configuration of PSLV. The PS-1 stage burned for around 105 seconds and at 52 km. Followed by the ignition of the second stage. The Heat shield was separated at 176 seconds followed by the separation of Second stage at 260 seconds. The PS-3 was ignited at 261 seconds and separated at 561 seconds. This was followed by a successful insertion of the satellite into orbit.

ISRO Chairman K. Sivan congratulated the launch vehicle and satellite teams involved in the mission. With this launch, PSLV has carried 50 tonnes to space by launching 354 satellites, including national, student and foreign satellites. Almost 5000 visitors viewed the launch from the then recently opened visitors gallery.

== Payload ==
The mission carried RISAT-2B into orbit. RISAT-2B is an advanced Earth Observation satellite which has a 3.6m radial rib antenna. It also carried two piggyback payloads of Vikram processor and low cost MEMS based Inertial Navigation System developed by Semi-Conductor Laboratory, Chandigarh and ISRO Inertial Systems Unit, Thiruvananthapuram respectively. The Vikram 1601 processor was used for first time in navigation computer in the next mission PSLV-C47 after being test flown in redundant configuration on PSLV C46 mission.
