= PSLV-C48 =

Polar satellite launch vehicle mission by ISRO

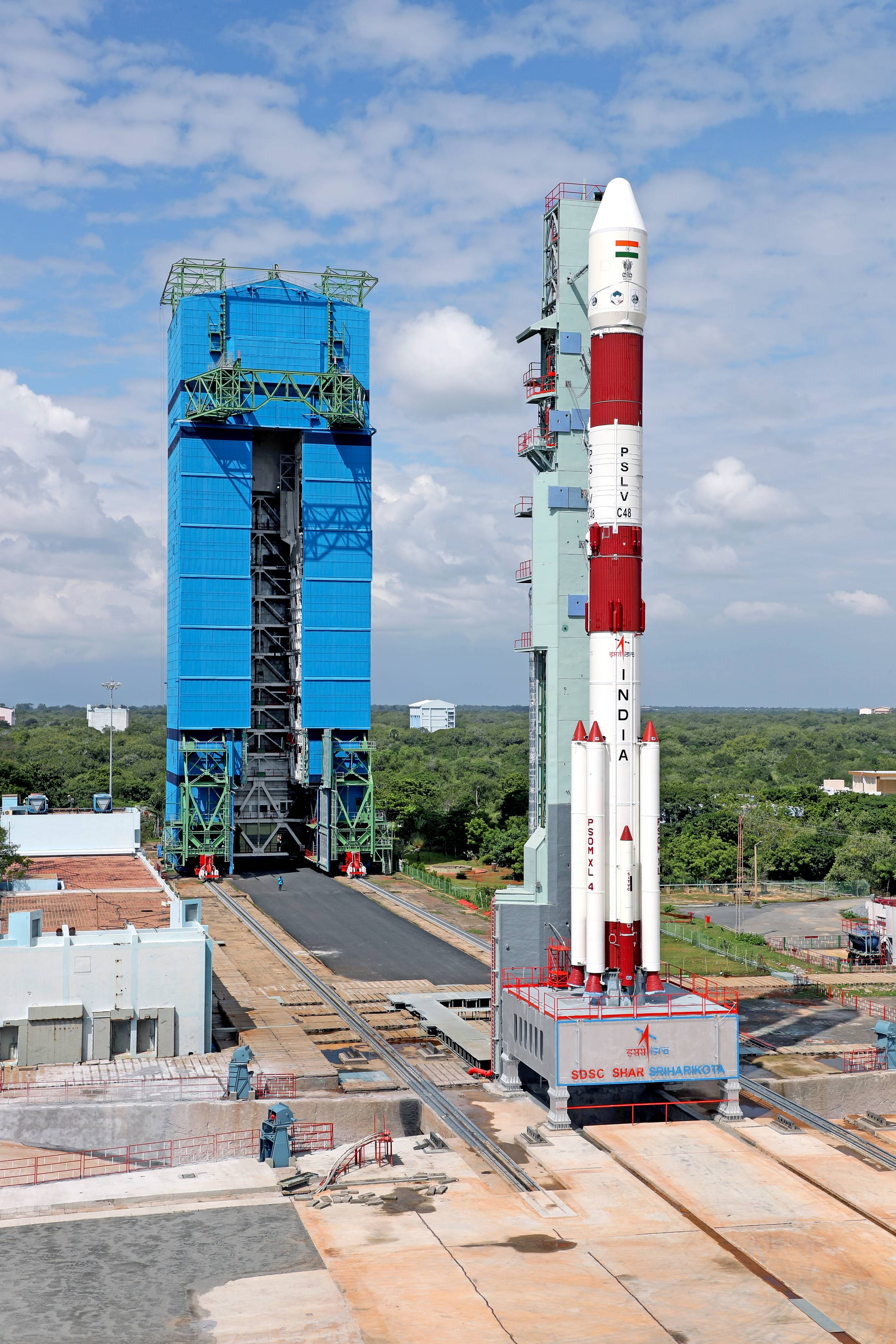

PSLV-QL launch
- Launch: 11 December 2019, 15:25:00 IST
- Operator: ISRO
- Pad: Sriharikota First
- Payload: India RISAT-2BR1; Japan QPS SAR-1 "Izanagi"「イザナギ」 United States Lemur-2 × 4 Israel Duchifat-3; United States 1HOPSAT; United States Tyvak-0129; Italy Tyvak-0092 (COMMTRAIL/NANOVA)
- Outcome: Success

PSLV launches

PSLV-C48 was a mission of the Indian Polar Satellite Launch Vehicle (PSLV) rocket, launched on Thursday, December 11, 2019, at 15:25 Hrs (IST) by the Indian Space Research Organisation (ISRO) from the second launch pad of the Satish Dhawan Space Centre at Sriharikota, Andhra Pradesh.

The mission's main satellite was RISAT-2BR1 along with other commercial satellites from various countries. RISAT-2BR1 was injected into an orbit of 576 km at an inclination of 37-degree to the equator, 16 minutes and 23 seconds after lift-off.

== Launch ==
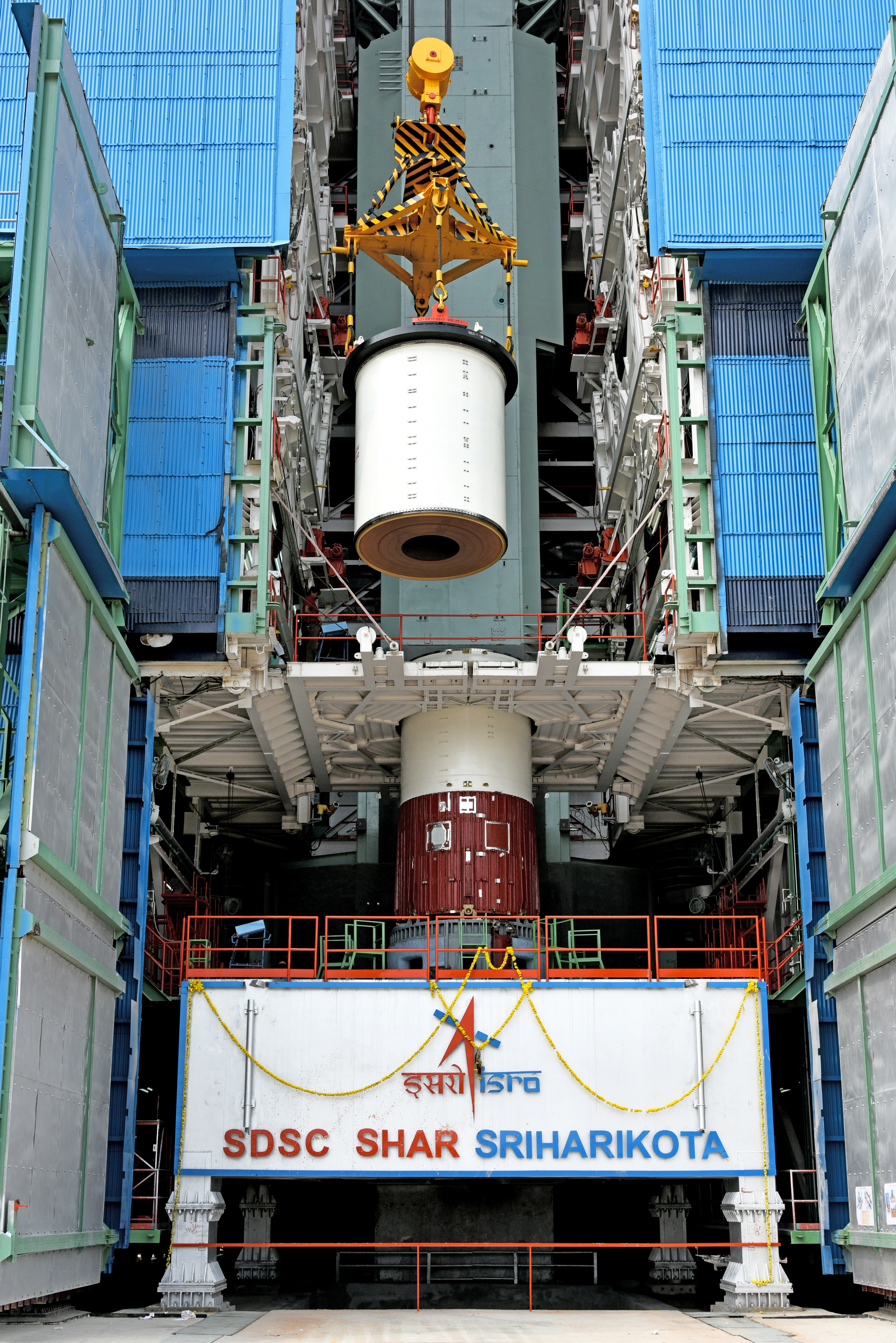
PSLV C48 RISAT-2BR1, core middle segment of first stage being integrated on launch platform at First Launch Pad.

PSLV-C48 was the 50th launch of the Polar Satellite Launch Vehicle and the 75th launch vehicle mission from Satish Dhawan Space Centre, Sriharikota. This is the 2nd flight of PSLV in 'QL' configuration (with 4 solid strap-on motors).

The first stage ignited for about 1 minute and 51 seconds, and got separated. This was followed by the second stage ignition and heat shield separation. The second stage separated at 4 minutes and 23 seconds. PS3 ignited and separated at 9-minute and 59 seconds. After ten seconds, last stage ignited and separated at 15 minutes and 24 seconds. RISAT-2BR1 separated at 16 minutes and 26 seconds, at an altitude of 578 km. Customer satellites separated between 17 minutes 26 seconds to 21 minutes 19 seconds.

== Payloads ==
RISAT-2BR1 is a radar imaging earth observation satellite weighing about 628 kg. It's a synthetic-aperture radar (SAR) imaging satellite that's the fourth one in the RISAT series.

Under commercial arrangement with New Space India Limited (NSIL), 9 commercial satellites was also launched into their desired orbits.

Tyvak-0092 (5 kg) is a search and rescue satellite from Italy.

Tyvak-0129 (11 kg) is a technology demonstration from US. Lemur is a Multi mission remote sensing platform from US. Four Lemur-2 cubesats by Spire Global was launched.

Duchifat-3 is a remote sensing satellite from ISRAEL, by Sha'ar Hanegev High School students built at Herzliya Science Center.

1HOPSAT (22 kg) high resolution video and imaging satellite by Hera systems for Seguritech of Mexico.

QPS SAR-1 "Izanagi"「イザナギ」(~100 kg) X-band is a Japanese SAR imaging satellite with 3.6 m antenna by iQPS.
