= RISAT-2BR1 =

Indian Earth observation satellite

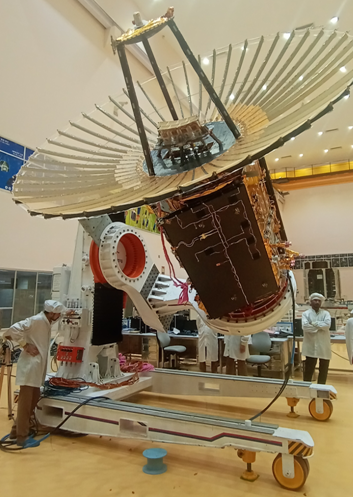
- RISAT-2BR1 with its "Radial Rib Antenna" in deployed configuration.
- Names: Radar Imaging Satellite-2BR1
- Mission type: Earth observation Radar imaging satellite
- Operator: ISRO
- COSPAR ID: 2019-089F
- SATCAT no.: 44857
- Website: https://www.isro.gov.in/
- Mission duration: 5 years (planned); 5 years, 11 months and 28 days (in progress)

Spacecraft properties
- Spacecraft: RISAR-2BR1
- Bus: RISAT
- Manufacturer: Indian Space Research Organisation
- Launch mass: 615 kg (1,356 lb)
- Power: 2 kW

Start of mission
- Launch date: 11 December 2019, 09:55 UTC
- Rocket: Polar Satellite Launch Vehicle, PSLV-C48
- Launch site: Satish Dhawan Space Centre, First Launch Pad (FLP)
- Contractor: Indian Space Research Organisation
- Entered service: March 2020

Orbital parameters
- Reference system: Geocentric orbit
- Regime: Low Earth orbit
- Perigee altitude: 555 km (345 mi)
- Apogee altitude: 555 km (345 mi)
- Inclination: 37.0°
- Period: 90.0 minutes

Instruments
- Synthetic Aperture Radar (X-band) (SAR-X)

RISAT-2BR1 is a synthetic-aperture radar (SAR) imaging satellite built by Indian Space Research Organisation (ISRO). It is part of India's RISAT series of SAR imaging satellite and fourth satellite in the series. RISAT-2BR1 was launched on 11 December 2019 at 09:55 UTC aboard Polar Satellite Launch Vehicle PSLV-C48 from First Launch Pad (FLP) of Satish Dhawan Space Centre. It was the 50th launch of Polar Satellite Launch Vehicle and 75th launch from Satish Dhawan Space Centre.

== Overview ==
The RISAT-2BR1 is follow on to RISAT-2B and has an X-band SAR with unfurlable radial rib reflector antenna of 3.6 meter diameter. RISAT-2BR1 can operate in different modes including Very High Resolution imaging modes of 1 x 0.5 m resolution and 0.5 x 0.3 m resolution with swath of 5 to 10 km.

- Mass: 628 kg (1,385 lb)
- Orbit: 557 km (346 mi) (circular) at inclination of 37.0°
- Mission life: 5 years

== Launch ==
RISAT-2BR1 was launched aboard PSLV-C48 on 11 December 2019 at 09:55 UTC with nine other ride-sharing commercial satellites from First Launch Pad of Satish Dhawan Space Centre, SHAR. Launch vehicle used was -QL variant of Polar Satellite Launch Vehicle with four PSOM-XL strap-ons and employed a 195 kg Dual Launch Adapter (DLA) to accommodate primary and secondary payloads. After a flight of 16 minutes 27 seconds, RISAT-2BR1 was separated from PSLV fourth stage (PS4) and injected into 576 km circular orbit with 37.0° inclination. After primary payload, DLA and subsequently nine other co-passenger satellites were separated. RISAT-2BR1 deployed it solar panels within 3 minutes after separation and deployed its 3.6 meter antenna on 08:30 UTC, on 12 December 2019.

=== Secondary payloads ===
Nine commercial ridesharing satellites weighed 157.6 kg cumulatively.

- QPS SAR-1 "Izanagi"「イザナギ」(~100 kg) X-band SAR imaging satellite with 3.6 m antenna by iQPS.
- Four Lemur-2 cubesats by Spire Global.
- Duchifat-3 (2.3 kg) by Sha'ar Hanegev High School students built at Herzliya Science Center.
- 1HOPSAT (22 kg) high resolution video and imaging satellite by Hera systems for Seguritech of Mexico.
- Tyvak-0129 (11 kg)
- Tyvak-0092 (5 kg) (NANOVA)

== See also ==
- List of Indian satellites
