= RISAT-2 =

Indian radar imaging reconnaissance satellite

- Names: Radar Imaging Satellite-2
- Mission type: Radar imaging (Reconnaissance and disaster management)
- Operator: Indian Air Force; ISRO
- COSPAR ID: 2009-019A
- SATCAT no.: 34807
- Website: www.isro.gov.in/Spacecraft/risat-2
- Mission duration: Planned: 5 years Final: 13 years, 6 months and 9 days

Spacecraft properties
- Spacecraft: RISAT-2
- Bus: OptSat-2000
- Manufacturer: ISRO (satellite); IAI (SAR radar)
- Launch mass: 300 kg (660 lb)
- Power: 750 watts

Start of mission
- Launch date: 20 April 2009, 01:15:00 UTC
- Rocket: PSLV-CA (PSLV-C12)
- Launch site: Satish Dhawan, SLP
- Contractor: Indian Space Research Organisation

End of mission
- Decay date: 30 October 2022, 00:06 UTC

Orbital parameters
- Reference system: Geocentric orbit
- Regime: Sun-synchronous orbit
- Altitude: 548 km (341 mi)
- Inclination: 41.0°
- Period: 90.0 minutes

RISAT-2, or Radar Imaging Satellite-2 was an Indian radar imaging reconnaissance satellite that was part of India's RISAT programme. It was procured from Israel Aerospace Industries (IAI) and successfully launched aboard a PSLV-CA launch vehicle at 01:15:00 UTC on 20 April 2009 from the Second Launch Pad at the Satish Dhawan Space Centre.

It is designed to monitor India's borders and as part of anti-infiltration and anti-terrorist operations. The satellite has a mass of 300 kg (660 lb).

== History ==
RISAT-2 was procured following the 2008 Mumbai attacks, due to delay with the indigenously developed C-band for RISAT-1. It is India's first dedicated radar reconnaissance satellite. RISAT-2 was procured at a cost of US$200 million from Israel. In terms of configuration and capability it is identical to TecSAR-1 launched in 2008 by ISRO's PSLV which marked the beginning of India-Israel space cooperation.

== Technical capabilities ==
RISAT-2 was India's first satellite with a synthetic-aperture radar (SAR). It possess day-night as well as all-weather monitoring capability. Potential applications include tracking hostile ships at sea that are deemed a military threat to India.

Though ISRO sought to underplay the satellite's defence applications in its announcements, a substantial number of articles concerning RISAT-2 in the Indian media continue to refer to it as a "spy satellite". This is also supported by the fact that its Israeli sensor is clearly pronounced a military grade sensor by its manufacturer Israel Aerospace Industries (IAI).

== Launch ==
ISRO scientists spent tense hours on 19 April 2009 prior to launch as one of the umbilical cords holding the PSLV-CA launch vehicle to the launch pad fell off, damaging nearly six connectors.

== ANUSAT satellite ==
The ANUSAT student microsatellite (40 kg) was launched aboard the same launch vehicle as a secondary payload.

== Mission ==
RISAT-2 was used to search for and eventually locate wreckage of the helicopter crash that claimed the life of Y. S. Rajasekhara Reddy, chief minister of the state of Andhra Pradesh, as well as the lives of his fellow passengers, while traveling over dense jungles in southern India on 2 September 2009. The satellite made an uncontrolled re-entry into the Earth's atmosphere over Sumatra on 30 October 2022 at 00:06 UTC after providing payload data for 13 years.

== See also ==
- List of Indian satellites
- Indian military satellites
- Indo-Israeli relations
