= PSLV-C49 =

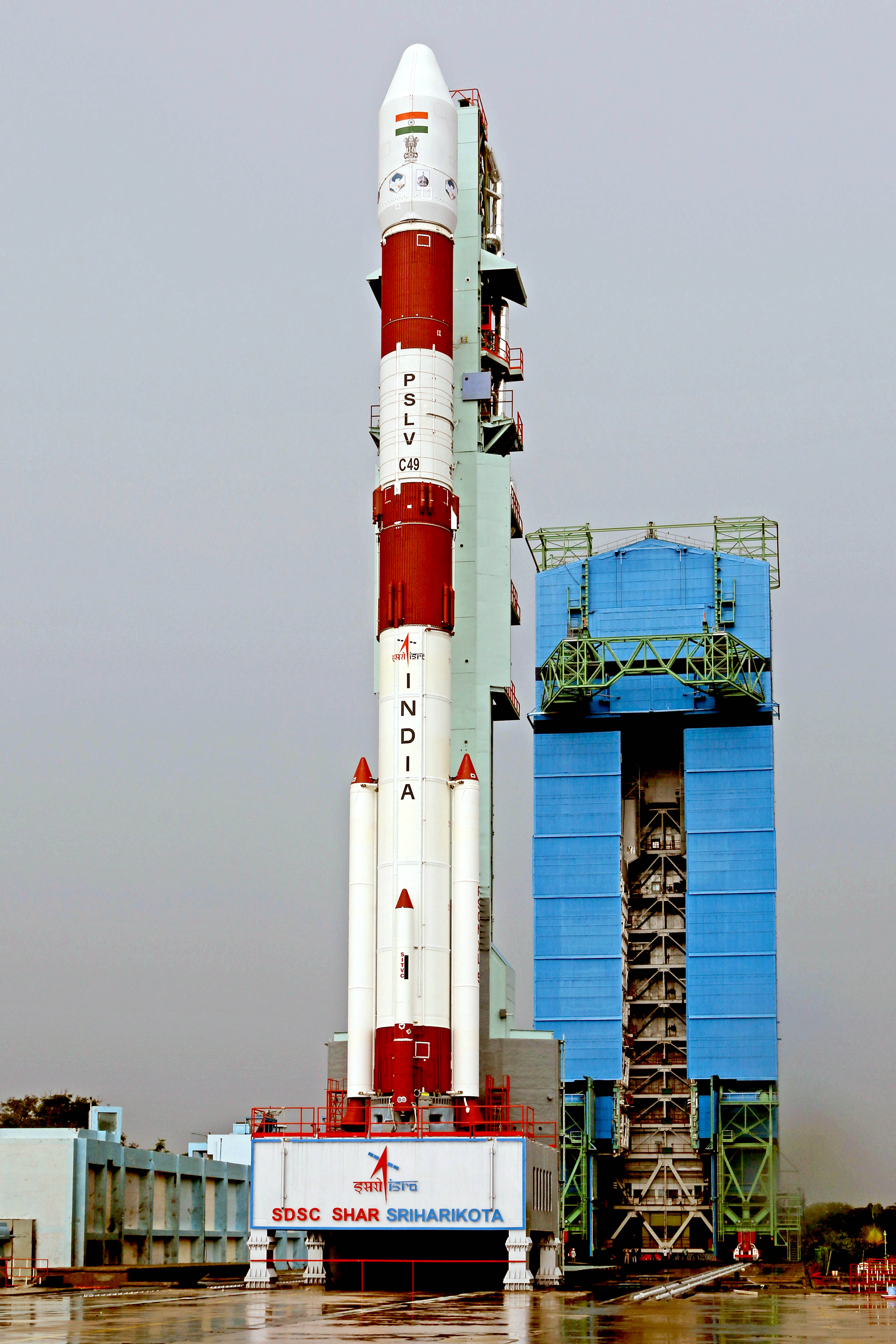
- PSLV-DL C49 at First launch pad

PSLV - DL launch
- Launch: November 7, 2020, 15:11 IST
- Pad: Sriharikota First
- Payload: (India) EOS-01 (Lithuania) R2 (Luxembourg) KSM-1A, KSM-1B, KSM-1C, KSM-1D (United States) Lemur-1, Lemur-2, Lemur-3, Lemur-4
- Outcome: Success

PSLV launches

The PSLV-C49 is the 51st mission of the Indian Polar Satellite Launch Vehicle (PSLV) and second flight in 'DL' configuration. The Polar Satellite Launch Vehicle (PSLV)-C49 was successfully launched from Second Launch Pad, Satish Dhawan Space Centre on November 7, 2020, at 9:41 (UTC) /15:11 (IST) carrying EOS-01 along with nine international customer satellites.

== Mission overview ==
- Propellant:
  - Stage 1: Composite Solid
  - Stage 2: Earth Storable Liquid
  - Stage 3: Composite Solid
  - Stage 4: Earth Storable Liquid

The PSLV-C49 rocket has four stages; each one was self-contained, with its own propulsion system, thereby capable of functioning independently. The first and third stages used composite solid propellants, while the second and fourth stage use earth-storable liquid propellant
