= Vayyar =

Israeli company

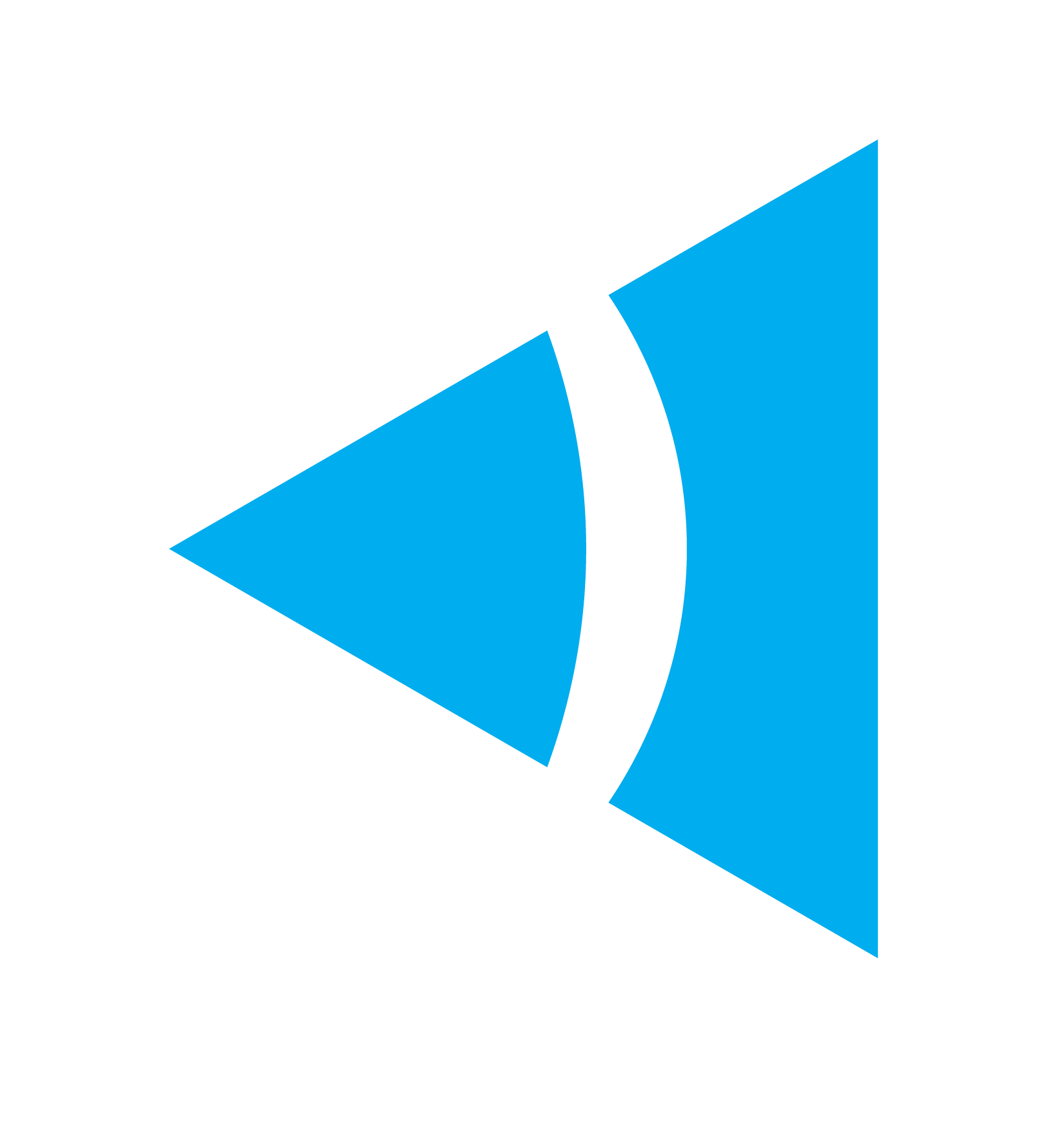
- Vayyar Imaging Ltd's logo
- Native name: ואיאר הדמאה בע"מ
- Founded: December 2011; 14 years ago
- Founder: Raviv Melamed, Miri Ratner, Naftali Hait
- Headquarters: Yehud-Monosson, Central, Israel
- Key people: Raviv Melamed
- Number of employees: 340
- Website: vayyar.com

Vayyar Imaging Ltd. (Hebrew: ואיאר הדמאה בע"מ) is an Israeli semiconductor company that produces 4D imaging radar sensors. Initially developed to provide a more effective means of screening for early-stage breast cancer, Vayyar’s Radar-on-Chip technology is now used in a number of other sectors, including automotive, senior care, retail, smart home and commercial property.

Vayyar has around 300 employees as of January 2021. The company is based in Israel with operations spanning across the globe. Vayyar also has offices in the US, Japan, China and Sweden.

== History ==
Vayyar was founded in 2011 by Raviv Melamed, Miri Ratner and Naftali Chayat. CEO Raviv Melamed was previously VP of Architecture Group at Intel and General Manager of Intel's Worldwide Mobile Wireless Group. The company is based in Yehud. The company's name "Vayyar," is derived from the biblical term וירא in the book of Genesis (Chap1:4,6,10,12,18,21), meaning "(he) saw."

The company’s sensor technology was originally developed to screen for breast cancer, as a more accessible and effective alternative to mammograms.

In May 2012, the company secured its seed round of funding. Since then there have been a total of five rounds of fundraising, raising $300 million in venture funds.

At the beginning of 2023, Vayyar had partnered with VinFast from Vietnam to enhance the driving experience and safety by integrating in-cabin radar technology.

== Products ==
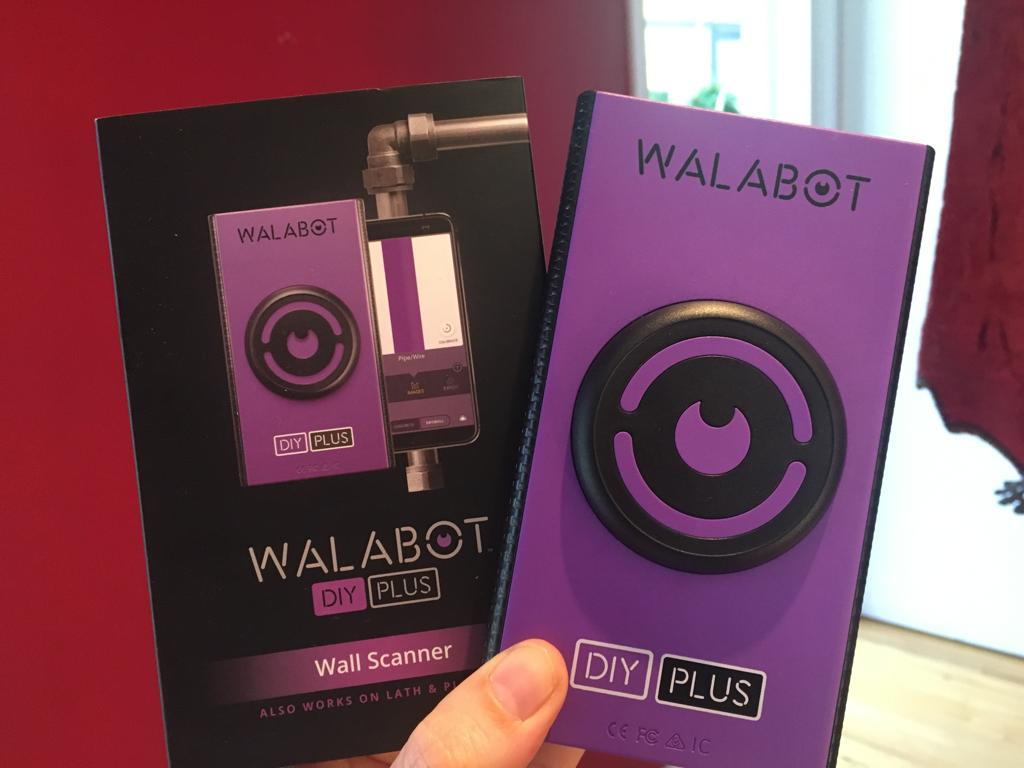
Vayyar's "Walabot DIY" wall scanner

Vayyar’s best-known product is Walabot DIY, a wall scanner and stud finder that detects pipes, electrical wiring and rodents inside drywall, concrete and lath and plaster.

The company also manufactures Vayyar Care, an automatic touchless fall detection system that's part of Amazon's Alexa Together service. Each Vayyar Care device provides wide room coverage, and can be installed in bedrooms, bathrooms, kitchen, or living spaces, ensuring round-the-clock protection.

In the automotive industry, Vayyar delivers solutions for in-car, ADAS and motorcycle safety. Inside the car, the technology supports applications such as Child Presence Detection (CPD) and enhanced Seat Belt Reminders, while externally, the sensors can be used for blind spot detection, collision warnings, advanced parking assistance, cross-traffic alerts, autonomous emergency braking, reverse monitoring, adaptive cruise control and lane change assist.

In August 2021 Vayyar was awarded a supply contract by Piaggio for its Advanced Rider Assistance Systems (ARAS). With an SOP 2022, the partnership brought the first-ever commercially available 4D imaging radar for the motorcycle and moped domain. Piaggio's subsidiary PFF also selected Vayyar’s 4D imaging radar platform for use in a range of consumer and enterprise robots, debuted in 2022.

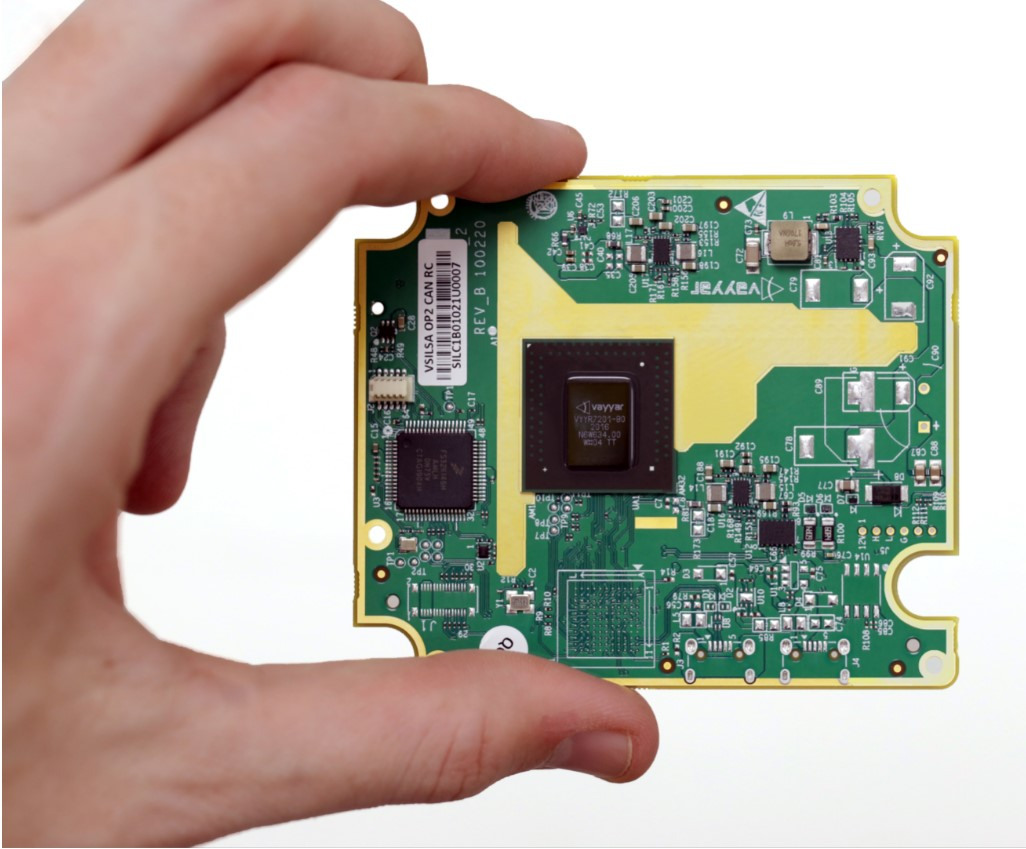
An automotive-grade 60 GHz 4D imaging radar sensor

Vayyar also provides Vector Signal and Network Analyzers for signal generation and testing. Other uses for Vayyar technology include imaging systems for homeland security, retail sensors for shopper insights and inventory monitoring, safety applications in industrial robotics, and agricultural solutions used to analyze soil saturation and the composition of liquids such as milk.

Vayyar also supplies a range of UWB-mmWave modules used by developers, product designers and engineers. These include the Walabot Maker (6-8 GHz) line, EVKs for smart home, retail and automotive applications (60 and 79 GHz) and Vayyar Element (60Ghz).

== Awards and recognition ==
Vayyar has received the following mentions:

- WEF Tech Pioneer 2018
- Calcalist's 50 Most Promising Startups
- Fast Company’s “World’s Most Innovative Companies”
- Digital Insurance Agenda "DIAmond" for being among "the most promising Insurtech companies in the industry."
- T3 Innovation Award
- IHS Markit IFA Award
- Plug and Play's People Choice Award
- CLEPA Innovation Awards 2020
- CES Innovation Awards 2021 for their automotive solution, for Vayyar Home and for Walabot DIY 2
- GSA's Most Respected Semiconductor Nominee
- PACEpilot "Innovation to Watch"

== See also ==
- Start-Up Nation
- Israeli technology
- Imaging radar
- High tech
- Semiconductor
