= EOS-N1 =

Indian Earth observation satellite

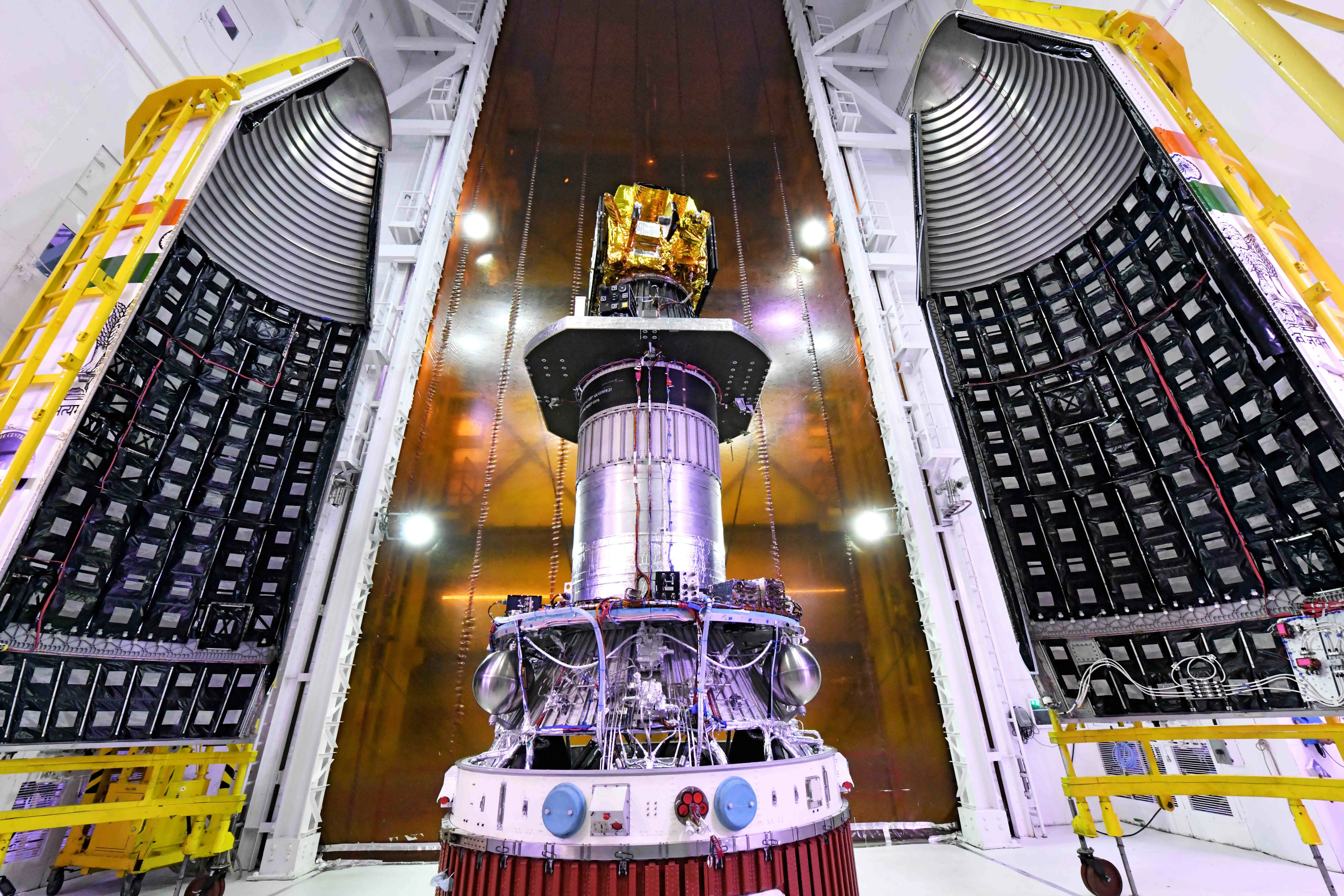
- Anvesha being integrated to the payload fairing of its launch vehicle
- Mission type: Earth Observation
- Operator: ISRO/DRDO
- Website: www.isro.gov.in

Spacecraft properties
- Manufacturer: DRDO

Start of mission
- Launch date: 12 January 2026 (lost in launch accident)
- Rocket: PSLV-C62
- Launch site: Satish Dhawan Space Centre FLP
- Contractor: ISRO

Orbital parameters
- Reference system: Geocentric orbit (planned)
- Regime: Sun-synchronous orbit (planned)
- Periapsis altitude: 505.291 km (313.973 mi) (planned)
- Apoapsis altitude: 505.29 km (313.97 mi) (planned)
- Inclination: 97.5 ± 0.12° (planned)

EOS-N1, also known as Anvesha, was an Indian hyperspectral Earth-imaging satellite developed by the Defence Research and Development Organisation for strategic and civilian applications. Launched on 12 January 2026 aboard the PSLV-C62, it was designed to capture hundreds of spectral bands to identify concealed objects and camouflage. The launch failed after a disturbance during the rocket's third-stage burn prevented it from reaching orbital velocity. EOS-N1 and 14 co-passenger satellites were lost, while one technology demonstrator survived and transmitted flight data.

== Launch ==
EOS-N1, also called Anvesha, was an Indian hyperspectral earth imaging satellite said to be built by DRDO for strategic defence purposes as well as for civilian monitoring in agriculture, urban mapping, and environmental assessment. It was designed to capture hundreds of spectral bands to help identify concealed objects and camouflage. The satellite was launched on 12 January 2026 aboard the PSLV-C62 as part of a commercial mission by NewSpace India Limited. However, a disturbance during the rocket's third-stage burn prevented it from reaching orbit, resulting in the loss of the satellite and most co-passenger payloads.

The PSLV-C62 mission lifted off at 10:18 IST on 12 January 2026 with EOS-N1 and 15 co-passenger satellites from Indian and foreign customers, including payloads from Brazil, the United Kingdom, Nepal, Spain and Thailand. The first two stages performed as expected, but near the end of the third stage burn, ISRO reported a roll-rate disturbance and a deviation from the planned flight path, and the rocket did not reach orbital velocity. According to The Week, telemetry showed a drop in chamber pressure in the third stage, the same problem as in the failure of PSLV-C61 in May 2025, which was the previous PSLV launch. ISRO set up a failure analysis committee to investigate. EOS-N1 and 14 of the co-passengers were lost, and the only payload known to have survived the launch was KID, a technology demonstrator from Orbital Paradigm, which transmitted flight data for about 190 seconds. EOS-N1 was described as a mini-satellite with a hyperspectral imager that captures hundreds of spectral bands, and was meant to help detect hidden targets and camouflage along India's borders.

== Gallery ==
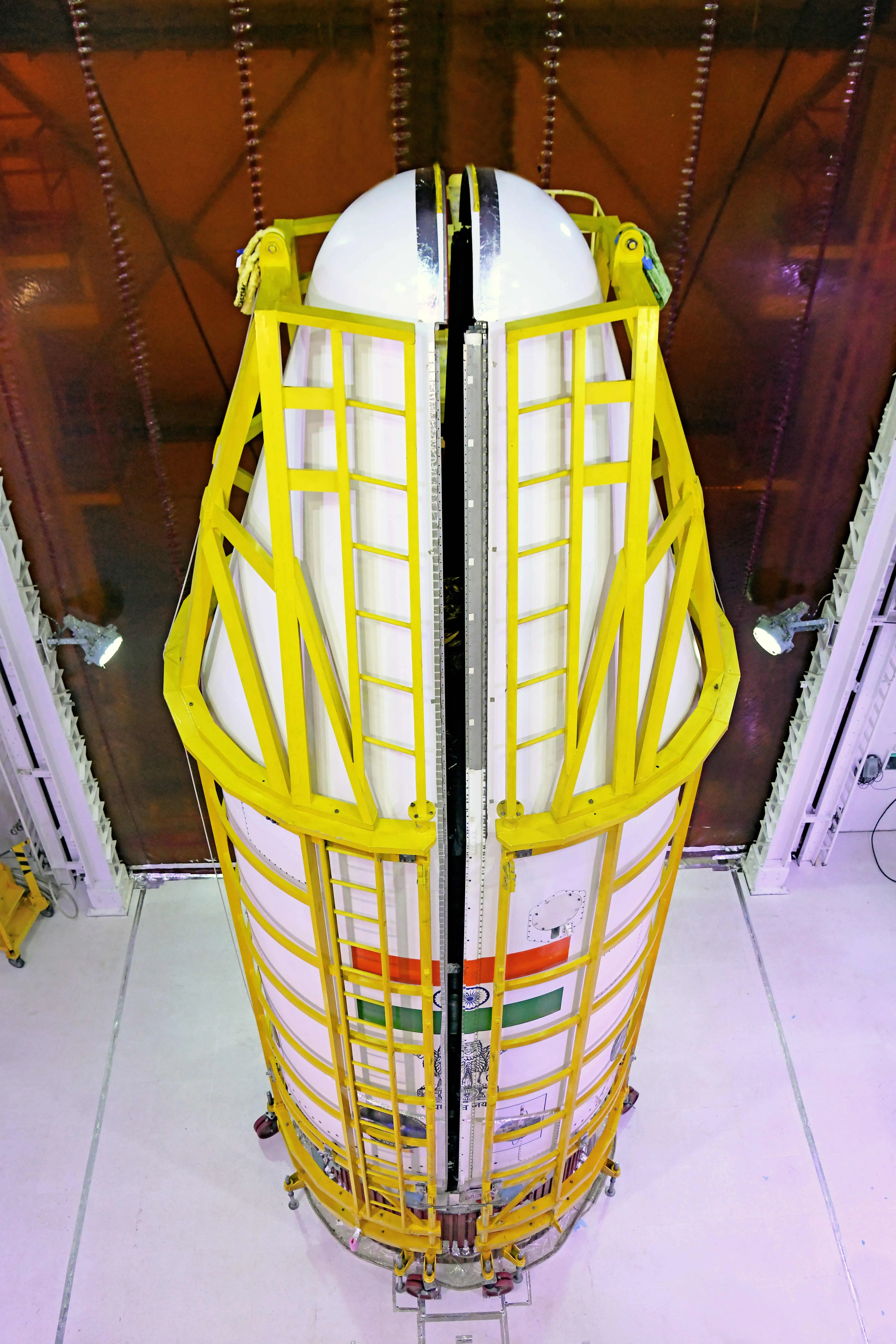
Payload encapsulation of EOS-N1

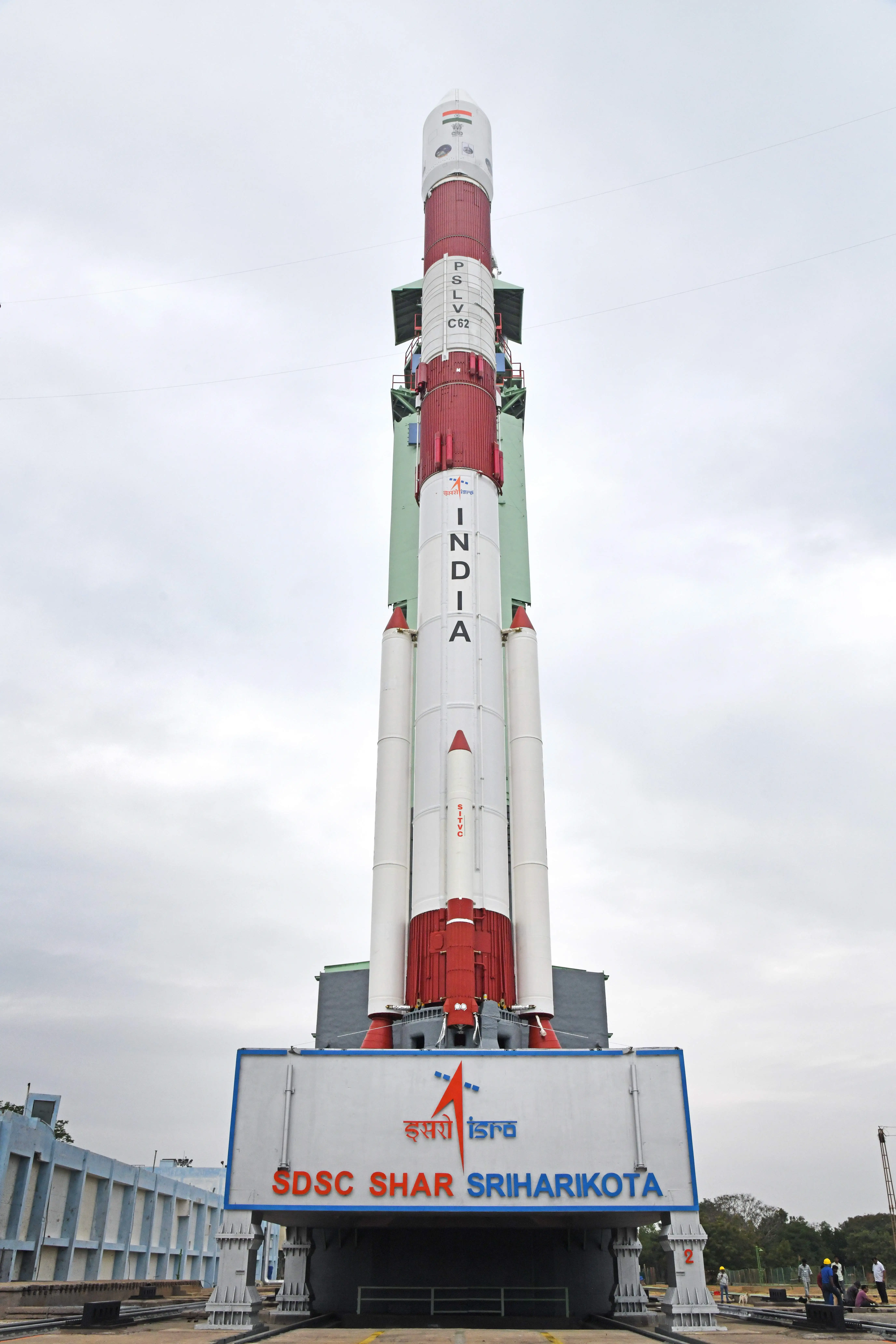
PSLV Rocket at launch pad

== See also ==
- Microsat-R
- Microsat-TD
- HySIS
- Space Based Surveillance project
