= KID (spacecraft) =

Space capsule technology demonstrator

- Mission type: Atmospheric entry technology demonstration
- Operator: (Spain) Orbital Paradigm

Spacecraft properties
- Spacecraft type: Uncrewed space capsule
- Launch mass: 25 kg
- Payload mass: 2 kg
- Dimensions: 40 cm (diameter)

Start of mission
- Launch date: 12 January 2026, 04:48:30 UTC
- Rocket: PSLV-C62
- Launch site: Satish Dhawan Space Centre
- Contractor: (India) ISRO
- Deployed from: PSLV 4th stage

End of mission
- Disposal: Ocean impact
- Landing date: 12 January 2026
- Landing site: South Indian Ocean

KID (Kestrel Initial Demonstrator) was a small experimental space capsule developed by the Spanish company Orbital Paradigm, with the support of European Space Agency's FLPP, as a subscale demonstrator for the future reusable space capsule Kestrel. According to the company, KID was constructed in one year by less than 10 engineers for less than one million Euros. KID's flight in 2026 was a failure due to a launch vehicle failure.

== Planned mission profile ==
KID had no propulsion of its own nor any parachutes and was not designed to be recovered after landing. After the rocket's fourth stage de-orbit maneuver, the capsule would separate and attempt to survive the reentry while transmitting data to Earth before impacting in the South Pacific Ocean.

== Flight ==
The capsule launched on 12 January 2026 on the PSLV-C62 rideshare mission of the Indian rocket PSLV. The spacecraft was presumed lost when the rocket's third stage encountered an anomaly in flight and the rocket failed to reach orbit. However, the company later revealed that KID separated from the falling fourth stage at around Mach 20 approximately 18 minutes after takeoff and managed to transmit three minutes of flight data. The capsule operated beyond its design envelope through peak forces over 35 g during the off-nominal re-entry at steeper angle than expected (around -20º instead of -5º) and managed to control its internal temperature. KID impacted in a remote region of the southern Indian Ocean. As the capsule had achieved 4 of the 5 launch milestones, the mission was declared a failure by Orbital Paradigm.

== Payload ==
The capsule had a payload capacity equivalent to a 2U CubeSat and carried experiments for three customers: the French company ALATYR, the British company Frontier Space, and Leibniz Universität Hannover, Germany. Due to short duration of the off-nominal flight, no customer payload data were transmitted.

== See also ==
- ARD
- SRE-1
