= Inverse synthetic-aperture radar =

Radar 2D mapping technique

Inverse synthetic-aperture radar (ISAR) is a radar technique using radar imaging to generate a two-dimensional high resolution image of a target. It is analogous to conventional SAR, except that ISAR technology uses the movement of the target rather than the emitter to create the synthetic aperture. ISAR radars have a significant role aboard maritime patrol aircraft to provide them with radar image of sufficient quality to allow it to be used for target recognition purposes. In situations where other radars display only a single unidentifiable bright moving pixel, the ISAR image is often adequate to discriminate between various missiles, military aircraft, and civilian aircraft.

== Radar cross-section imaging ==
Images of the target region produced by ISAR can be a useful tool in locating scattering regions on the target. ISAR images are often produced by rotating the target and processing the resultant Doppler histories of the scattering centers. If the target rotates in azimuth at a constant rate through a 'small' angle, scatterers will approach or recede from the radar at a rate depending only on the cross range position—the distance normal to the radar line of sight with the origin at the target axis of rotation. The rotation will result in the generation of cross range dependent Doppler frequencies which can be sorted spatially by a Fourier transform. For small angles, an ISAR image is the 2-dimensional Fourier transform of the received signal as a function of frequency and target aspect angle.

If the target is rotated through large angles, the Doppler frequency history of a scatterer becomes non-linear, following a sine wave trajectory. This Doppler history can not be processed directly by a Fourier transform because of the smeared Doppler frequency history resulting in the loss of cross range resolution. The maximum rotation angle which can be processed by an unmodified Fourier transform is determined by the constraint that the aperture phase error across the synthesized aperture should vary by less than a specified (arbitrary) amount, for example 45 degrees. This occurs when the synthetic aperture to the target range is less than required by the $\frac{2 D^2}{\lambda}$ limit where $D$ is the required lateral extent of the target. At this point the synthetic aperture is within the target nearfield region and requires focusing. The focusing is accomplished by applying a phase correction to the synthetic aperture.

== Applications ==
ISAR is used in maritime surveillance for the classification of ships and other objects. In these applications the motion of the object due to wave action often plays a greater role than object rotation. For instance a feature which extends far over the surface of a ship such as a mast will provide a high sinusoidal response which is clearly identifiable in a two dimensional image. Images sometimes produce an uncanny similarity to a visual profile with the interesting effect that as the object rocks towards or away from the receiver the alternating doppler returns cause the profile to cycle between upright and inverted. ISAR for maritime surveillance was pioneered by Texas Instruments in collaboration with the Naval Research Laboratory and became an important capability of the P-3 Orion and the S-3B Viking US Navy aircraft.

Research has been done also with land based ISAR. The difficulty in using this capability is that the object motion is far less in magnitude and usually less periodic than in the maritime case.

Perhaps the most visually striking and scientifically compelling application of ISAR is in the deep space imaging of asteroids. A particularly beautiful example of this is the so-called "dog's bone" 216 Kleopatra asteroid, which lies roughly 20% further away from the earth than the sun. The asteroid is only 60 miles wide at its midpoint. Yet the imagery is crisp and looks like an optical image. This has been cited as akin to using a telescope in Los Angeles that is the size of the human eye's lens to image a car in New York. Of course, the trick here is that the asteroid is presented among a very sparse background, allowing for substantial disambiguation.

In February 2013, Indra Sistemas, a Spanish technology company, announced the first passive ISAR. A passive radar is characterised by not emitting any form of radiation, i.e., it uses the signals present in the environment. In this case, the radar uses digital terrestrial television signals as the non-cooperative source of illumination in the environment.

== Errors ==
Errors in the ISAR imaging process generally result in defocusing and geometry errors in the image. ISAR transform errors include:

- Unknown target or antenna motion: Unmodeled motion will cause the target image to defocus and be at an incorrect location. This error is controlled by suitable mechanical design or by the use of auto-focus techniques. This error can be measured by the analytic signal phase measurement method described earlier.
- Vertical nearfield errors: Unless 3D ISAR is performed, the vertical target extent at right angles to the horizontal synthetic aperture must fit within the vertical far field limit. Tall targets will defocus and move to incorrect positions. The 2D ISAR representation of a target region is a planar surface.
- Integrated sidelobe return: ISAR image quality is degraded by range and azimuth compression side lobes. The sidelobes are due to data truncation and can be reduced by the application of appropriate window functions. The sidelobes can cause significant image degradation. First, the peaks of the stronger sidelobes may cause a string of progressively weaker targets to appear on either side of a strong target. Second, the combined power of all sidelobes tends to fog or washout detail in low RCS areas. The integrated sidelobe level can under poor conditions reach a level 10 dB below the peak target return.
- Frequency and azimuth sampling errors: Incorrectly selected frequency or aspect deltas will result in aliased images, creating spurious targets. The SIM program described earlier specifically monitors for aliening errors effectively eliminating this error source.
- Antenna aberrations: Aberrations in the geometry result when the antenna phase center position is dependent upon the antenna aspect or RF frequency. This error source is normally controlled by using small, simple antennas over narrow frequency bands at long ranges. First order corrections to frequency dispersive antennas such as log periodic can be handled by phase correcting the received signal. Full correction of the aberrations can be accomplished by a direct integration of the ISAR transform using the aberrated geometry.
- Target dispersion: Dispersive targets have a non-minimum phase response, appearing to shift in position with RF frequency. Examples of dispersive targets include RF absorbers in which the absorption depth is a function of frequency and various antenna in which the phase center position is frequency dependent. CW ISAR imaging or in some cases preprocessing prior to a FMCW ISAR transform can eliminate dispersive defocusing of the target image.
- Multipath: Multiple reflections can result in ISAR imaging distortions such as the classic ghost image trails from jet aircraft tail pipes.

Errors in the 2D planar Inverse ISAR transform include:

- Image blocking modeling errors: The Inverse ISAR transform currently assumes that scatterers are on a planar surface and cannot block other scatterers.
- Image multipath modeling errors: The Inverse ISAR transform currently does not model the multipath environment. Note the current ISAR transforms also do not correctly process multipath.

== See also ==
- Aperture synthesis
- Beamforming
- Optical heterodyne detection
- Phased array
- Radar cross-section
- Synthetic-aperture radar
