= RISAT-1 =

Indian Earth observation satellite

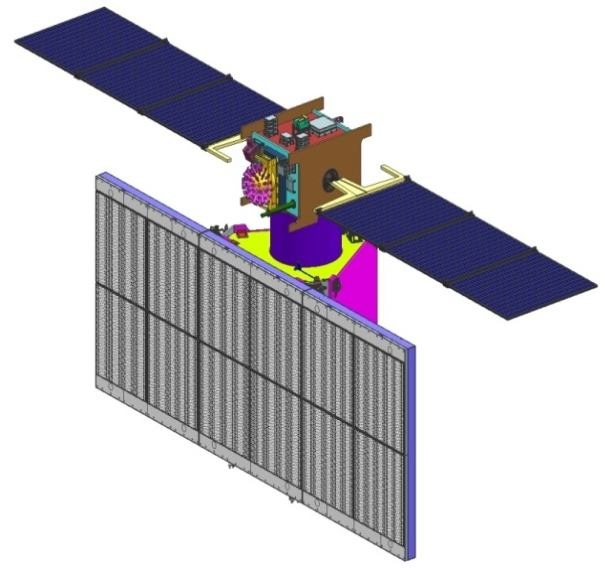
- Render of RISAT-1 satellite
- Names: Radar Imaging Satellite-1
- Mission type: Earth observation Radar imaging satellite
- Operator: ISRO
- COSPAR ID: 2012-017A
- SATCAT no.: 38248
- Website: https://www.isro.gov.in/
- Mission duration: 5 years (planned); 4 years (achieved)

Spacecraft properties
- Bus: RISAT
- Manufacturer: Indian Space Research Organisation
- Launch mass: 1,858 kg (4,096 lb)
- Power: 2.2 kW

Start of mission
- Launch date: 26 April 2012, 00:17 UTC
- Rocket: Polar Satellite Launch Vehicle-XL, PSLV-C19
- Launch site: Satish Dhawan Space Centre, First Launch Pad (FLP)
- Contractor: Indian Space Research Organisation
- Entered service: 19 October 2012

End of mission
- Deactivated: 31 March 2017
- Last contact: 30 September 2016

Orbital parameters
- Reference system: Geocentric orbit
- Regime: Sun-synchronous orbit
- Perigee altitude: 539 km (335 mi)
- Apogee altitude: 543 km (337 mi)
- Inclination: 97.55°
- Period: 95.49 minutes
- Mean motion: 14

Instruments
- Synthetic-aperture radar (C-band) (SAR-C)

Radar Imaging Satellite 1 or RISAT-1, was an Indian remote sensing satellite built and operated by the Indian Space Research Organisation (ISRO). The second RISAT satellite to be launched, it used a C-band 5.35 GHz synthetic-aperture radar (SAR) for Earth observation.

The launch of RISAT-1 came several years after that of RISAT-2, which carried an Israeli-built X-band radar. The RISAT-2 mission was prioritised over RISAT-1 following the 2008 Mumbai attacks, resulting in RISAT-1 being delayed by several years.

== Satellite description ==
RISAT-1 had a mass at liftoff of 1,858 kg (4,096 lb), making it the heaviest Earth observation satellite to be launched by India, and the heaviest satellite to be launched using a Polar Satellite Launch Vehicle. It had the capability to take images of Earth during day and night, as well as in cloudy conditions.

The satellite is equipped with a 160 × 4 Mbit/s data handling system, 50 Newton-metre-second reaction wheels, and a phased array antenna with dual polarisation.

The mission has an approximate cost of ₹4.90 billion (US$51 million);the spacecraft itself cost ₹3.79 billion (US$39 million) to develop, and a further ₹1.11 billion (US$12 million) to launch. The satellite had a design life of five years.

The satellite was used for natural resources management, primarily agriculture planning and forestry surveys, as well as to predict and prevent flooding. It was used for monitoring paddy plantations and yields in the kharif season and to assist India's food security planning. Pictures from RISAT-1 was used to estimate the number of hectares being farmed in India, to assess crop health and predict total yield. It was also used to identify wreckage from aircraft that crashed in forested areas. RISAT-1 was not designed as a surveillance satellite, given its reliance on the C-band.

== Instrument ==
Its synthetic-aperture radar (SAR-C) has a resolution of 3 m to 50 m. It also supports a spotlight mode for prolonged focus on a given geographical area at a resolution of 1 m. Most of the design and the installation of basic instrument subsystems for the satellite was conducted in 2010.

== Mission history ==
=== Launch ===
RISAT-1 was launched at 00:17 UTC (05:47 IST) on 26 April 2012 by a Polar Satellite Launch Vehicle, flight number C19, flying in the XL configuration with extended length solid strap-on boosters. The launch, which was the third flight of the PSLV-XL configuration, took place from the First Launch Pad of the Satish Dhawan Space Centre in Sriharikota, Andhra Pradesh. The launch marked the twenty-first flight of the PSLV, and its nineteenth successful launch.

After launch RISAT-1 was placed in 470 x 480 km orbit with near 97° inclination. In next two days, RISAT-1 raised its orbital altitude using on-board propulsion to place itself into its operational Sun-synchronous orbit of 536 km with 06:00 Local Time of Equator Crossing. The satellite began its normal operations with a repetitive cycle of 25 days.

=== Incidents ===
On 30 September 2016, Joint Space Operations Center identified a debris generating event near RISAT-1. The event created 16 pieces out of which 15 decayed and one was catalogued on 6 October 2016 under NORAD ID: 41797 and COSPAR ID: 2012-017C and decayed on 12 October 2016. Cause of this event was not officially declared but could be related to power system of satellite. A month later on 3 November 2016, RISAT-1 data was declared unavailable on ESA's Copernicus Space Component Data Access portal due to satellite outage. Satellite was experiencing anomalies but ISRO denied they were related to fragmentation event.

=== End of mission ===
On 26 July 2017, Department of Space released names of its operational satellites in a reply to a Parliamentary query and RISAT-1 was not included in the list. Later in Annual Report 2017–18 of Department of Space, RISAT-1 was declared non-operational.
