= PSLV-C62 =

Failed 2026 Indian satellite launch

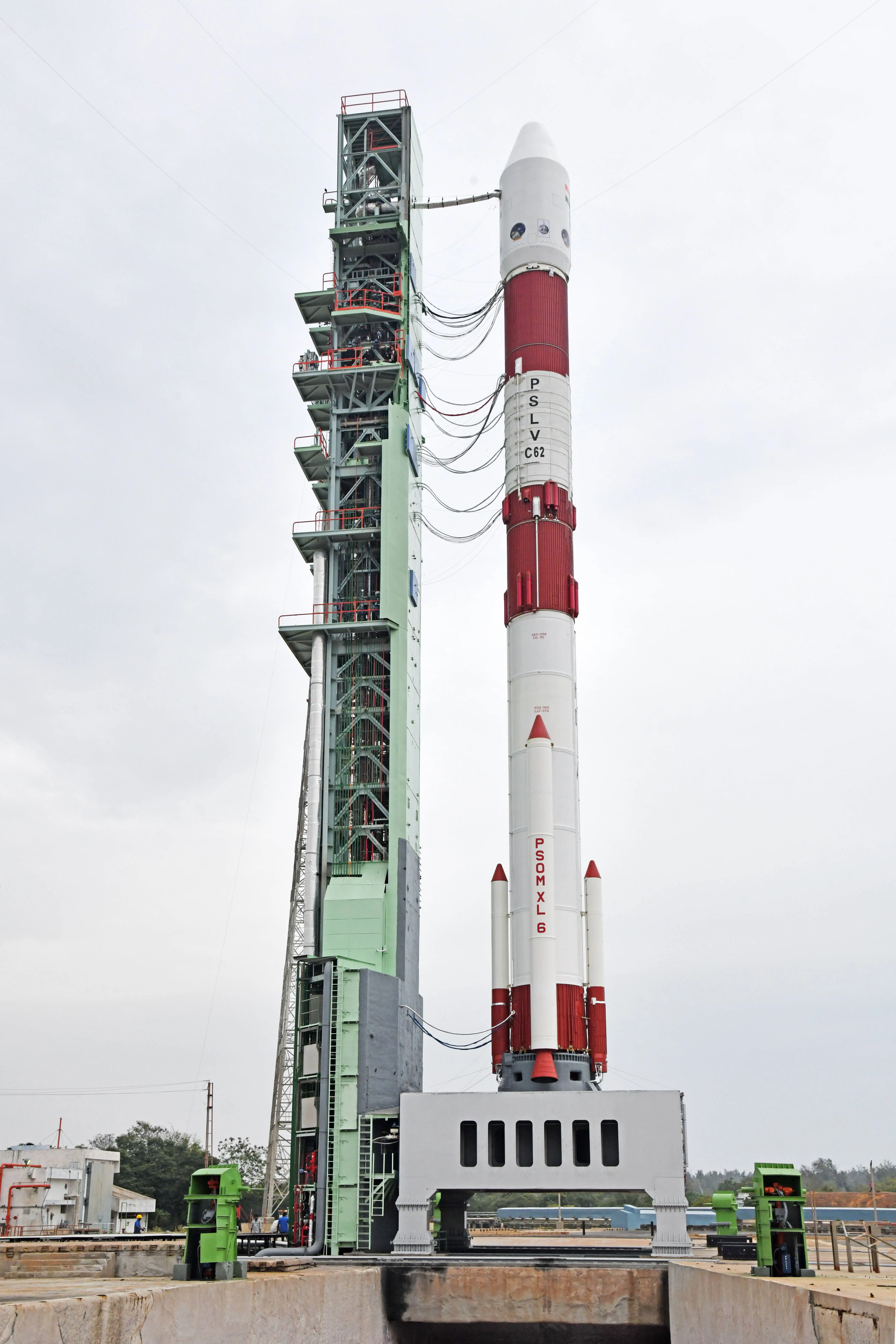
- PSLV-C62 at the FLP before Liftoff

PSLV-DL launch
- Launch: 12 January 2026; 10:17 AM IST (UTC +5:30)
- Operator: ISRO
- Pad: Satish Dhawan FLP
- Payload: (India) EOS-N1; (India) AayulSAT; (Spain) KID; 17 other payloads
- Outcome: Failure

PSLV launches

The PSLV-C62 was the 64th flight of the ISRO's PSLV and its return to flight mission following PSLV-C61. The mission was launched on 12 January 2026 with multiple payloads for customers but failed to reach orbit.

== Mission overview ==
- Mass:
  - Payload weight: 1710 kg total
- Overall height: 44.4 m (146 ft)
- Propellant:
  - Boosters (PSOM-XL): Composite Solid (Solid Stage)
  - Stage 1 (S-139) : Composite Solid (Solid Stage)
  - Stage 2 (PL-40HP) : Earth Storable Liquid (Liquid Stage)
  - Stage 3 (HPS-3): Composite Solid (Solid Stage)
  - Stage 4 (L-2.5(AI)) : Earth Storable Liquid (Liquid Stage)
- Propellant mass:
  - Boosters: 12,000 kg (26,000 lb)
  - Stage 1: 139,000 kg (306,000 lb)
  - Stage 2: 41,000 kg (90,000 lb)
  - Stage 3: 7,650 kg (16,870 lb)
  - Stage 4: 1,600 kg (3,500 lb)
- Altitude:505.291 km
- Semi Major Axis: 6883.428 ± 10 km
- Inclination: 97.5 ± 0.12°
- Azimuth: 140°

== Payload ==
The primary payload of the mission was the EOS-N1 imaging satellite built for strategic purposes by DRDO. A small 25 kg football-sized space capsule developed by the Spain-based startup Orbital Paradigm called Kestrel Initial Demonstrator (KID) flew on the PS-4 stage. Bengaluru-based space company OrbitAID Aerospace expected to perform an on-orbit satellite refuelling experiment with AayulSAT. Twelve other commercial payloads totalling about 200 kg from companies and research institutions from India, Brazil, Nepal, Thailand, Spain, France, and the United Kingdom were also manifested for this flight. The PS-4 was planned to make an orbital re-entry with the KID payload attached following primary payload injection. This was ISRO's first launch attempt of 2026.

== Flight ==
The rocket lifted off at 10:18:30 AM IST. The first and second stages performed normally during the course of flight. However, near the end of the third stage's operation, a deviation was observed in the flight controls related to its roll-rates just prior to stage separation, resulting in flight failure. The Spanish re-entry space capsule KID survived the initial launch failure, as it managed to separate from the rocket and transmitted flight data for three minutes with a peak of 28 g during its non-nominal descent. It has been presumed that the vehicle achieved a suborbital trajectory of approximately -3800 x 390 km with a 98-degree inclination before plummeting roughly near 75°E, 18°S over the Southern Indian Ocean.

== Failure analysis ==
ISRO Chairman V. Narayanan indicated that detailed analysis for the flight's failure has been initiated by ISRO, refusing additional media statements. It was also noted that a similar failure was the cause for the unsuccessful C-61 flight eight months prior. NSA director Ajit Doval visited VSSC facilities following the flight failure due to the presence of national security payload on-board, where he was given an appraisal of events by VSSC director A. Rangarajan. ISRO has also consulted an external agency under K Vijay Raghavan Committee in addition to its own Failure Analysis Committee, chaired by former chairman K.Sivan. The FAC is to submit its report to the PMO by June, with the next return to flight launch for the PSLV rocket scheduled for late-June 2026. The FAC submitted its report on 13 June, and India's minister for the Department of Space, Jitendra Singh Rana, said that cause of the flight's failure had been found, but that it could not be publicly disclosed. An Upgraded stage was test fired on 12th November, with essential changes made to the nozzle flex design, and additional evaluation on assembly procedures, raw materials and pre-flight checks being implemented into the stage. Furter tests are also planned to verify the stage before it's next flight.

== See also ==
- List of PSLV launches
- 2026 in spaceflight
