= PSLV-C52 =

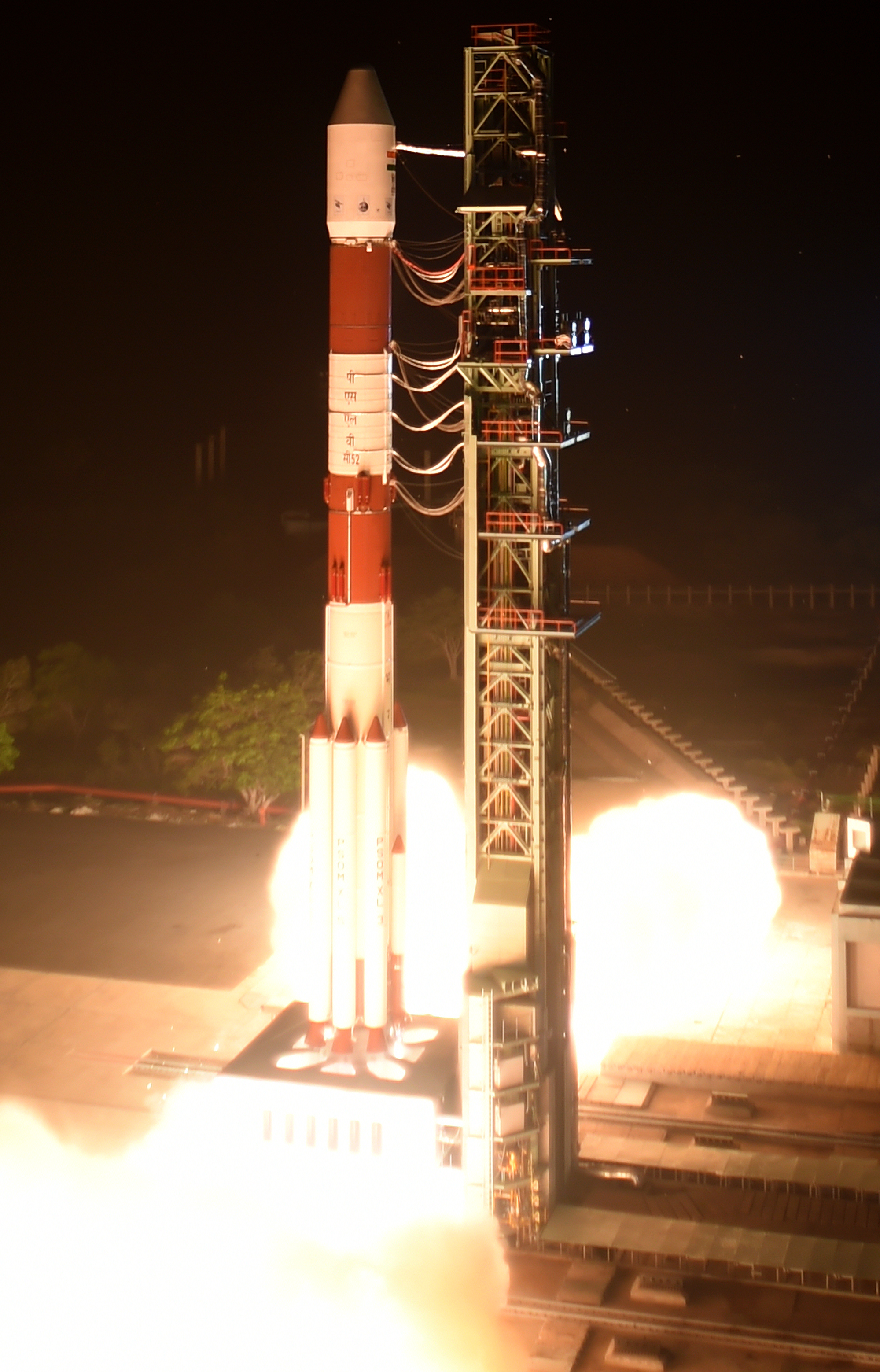
- PSLV-XL C52 lifting off from First launch pad

PSLV-XL launch
- Launch: 14 February 2022, 05:59:00 IST
- Pad: Sriharikota First
- Payload: (India) EOS-04 (India) (United States) INSPIREsat (India) (Bhutan) INS-2TD
- Outcome: Success

PSLV launches

The PSLV-C52 is the 54th mission of the Indian Polar Satellite Launch Vehicle (PSLV) program. The Polar Satellite Launch Vehicle (PSLV)-C52 was launched at 05:59 (IST) on 14 February 2022 with the RISAT-1A(EOS-04), INSPIREsat, INS-2TD as its main payload.

== Details ==
The PSLV-C52 was launched from the First Launch Pad of the Satish Dhawan Space Centre in Sriharikota, Andhra Pradesh, India. The PSLV C52 rocket carried primary payload, RISAT-1A with 2 other satellites. These will be the INSPIREsat from the IIST and the INS-2TD technology demonstrator from ISRO.

== Launch schedule ==
The PSLV-C52 was launched at 5:59 (IST) on 14 February 2022.

== Mission overview ==
- Propellant:
  - Stage 1: Composite Solid
  - Stage 2: Earth Storable Liquid
  - Stage 3: Composite Solid
  - Stage 4: Earth Storable Liquid

The PSLV C52 rocket has four stages; each one was self-contained, with its own propulsion system, thereby capable of functioning independently. The first and third stages used composite solid propellants, while the second and fourth stage use earth-storable liquid propellant.
