= RISAT-2B =

Indian Earth observation satellite

- Names: Radar Imaging Satellite-2B
- Mission type: Earth observation Radar imaging satellite disaster management)
- Operator: ISRO
- COSPAR ID: 2019-028A
- SATCAT no.: 44233
- Website: https://www.isro.gov.in/
- Mission duration: 5 years (planned); 7 years, 4 months and 24 days (in progress)

Spacecraft properties
- Spacecraft: RISAT-2B
- Bus: RISAT
- Manufacturer: Indian Space Research Organisation
- Launch mass: 615 kg (1,356 lb)
- Power: 2000 watts

Start of mission
- Launch date: 22 May 2019, 00:00 UTC
- Rocket: Polar Satellite Launch Vehicle-CA PSLV-C46
- Launch site: Satish Dhawan Space Centre, First Launch Pad (FLP)
- Contractor: Indian Space Research Organisation
- Entered service: August 2019

Orbital parameters
- Reference system: Geocentric orbit
- Regime: Sun-synchronous orbit
- Altitude: 555 km (345 mi)
- Inclination: 37.0°
- Period: 93.0 minutes

Instruments
- Synthetic Aperture Radar (X-band) (SAR-X)

RISAT-2B, or Radar Imaging Satellite-2B is an Indian radar reconnaissance satellite that is part of India's RISAT programme and the third satellite in the series. It is built by Indian Space Research Organisation (ISRO) to replace RISAT-2.

== Overview ==
RISAT-2B satellites will succeed India's ten-year-old RISAT-2 spacecraft. Equipped with X-band radar imagers, RISAT-2B monitors the Earth day and night, in any weather conditions. RISAT uses a technique called Synthetic Aperture Radar (SAR) to build images of the Earth below it. Signals transmitted from the satellite are reflected from the surface and its echo is recorded when it reaches back to the satellite. These signals can then be processed to build a profile of the ground below. The RISAT constellation is operated by the ISRO. While ISRO states the satellites applications as supporting agriculture, forestry and disaster management, their primary purpose is military surveillance.

RISAT-2B can operate in different modes including Very High Resolution Radar (VHRR) imaging modes of 1 × 0.5 m resolution and 0.5 × 0.3 m resolution. It is placed in an inclined orbit for better revisit rates over area of interest. Being a radar imaging satellite, RISAT-2B can image during day or night and in all weather conditions.

== Satellite description ==
RISAT-2B's main sensor is an indigenously developed synthetic-aperture radar (SAR) imaging satellite operating in X-band with 3.6 m radial rib antenna. The satellite is utilized for high resolution spot imaging of locations of interest and it has a mass of 615 kg (1,356 lb).

== Launch ==
It was successfully launched aboard the Polar Satellite Launch Vehicle PSLV-C46 at 00:00 UTC on 22 May 2019 from the first launch pad at the Satish Dhawan Space Centre.

== See also ==
- List of Indian satellites
- PSLV-C46
