= PSLV-C61 =

Failed 2025 Indian satellite launch

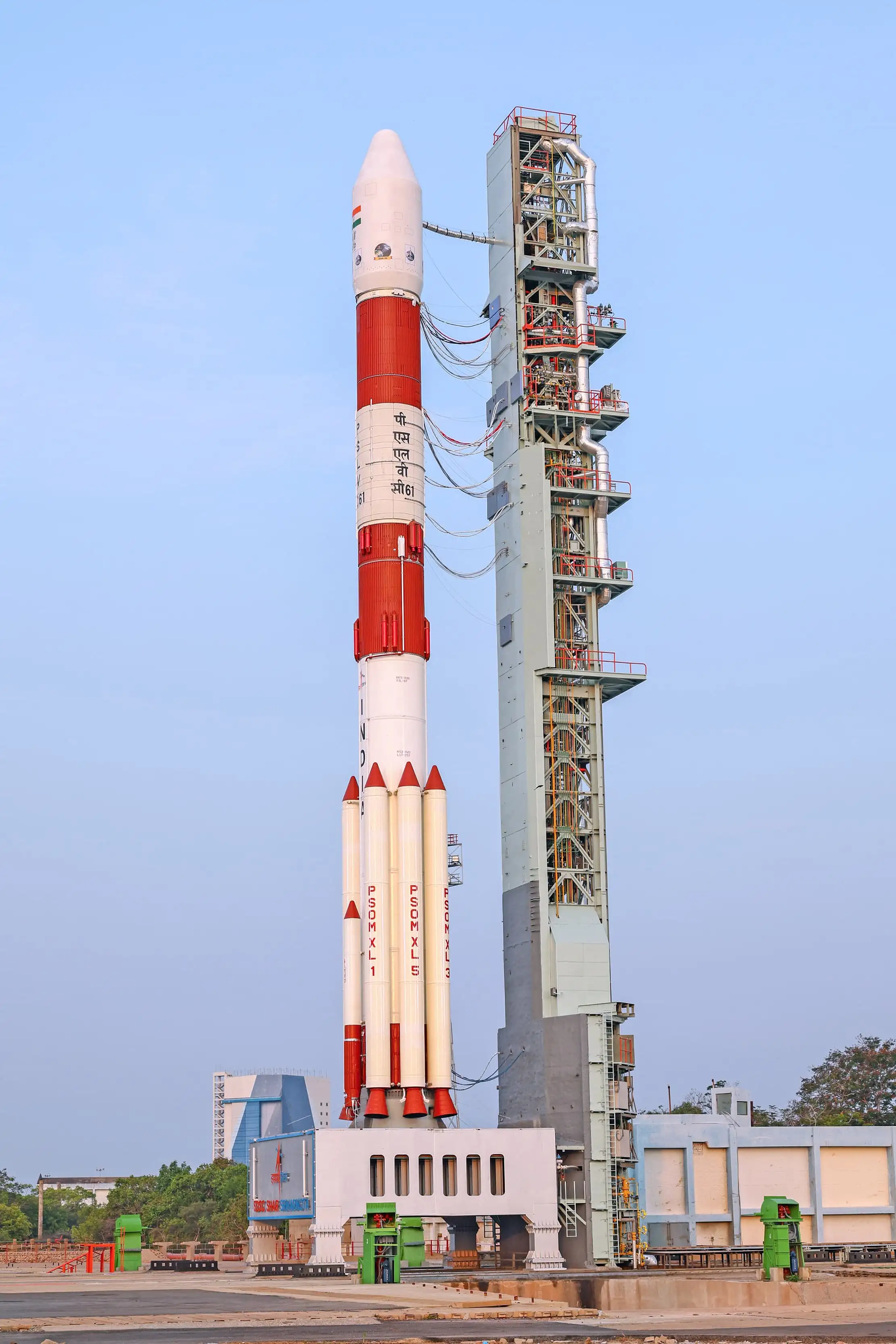

PSLV-XL launch
- Launch: 18 May 2025; 5:59 AM IST (UTC +5:30)
- Operator: ISRO
- Pad: SDSC FLP
- Payload: EOS-09 (RISAT-1B)
- Outcome: Failure

PSLV launches

The PSLV-C61 was the 63rd flight of the ISRO's PSLV and its 27th flight in the XL configuration. The mission launched on 18 May 2025 carrying EOS-09 (RISAT 1-B).

== Payload ==
Earth Observation Satellite-09 (EOS-09), also called RISAT 1-B was planned to be the seventh satellite in ISRO's RISAT series. It is a C-band synthetic aperture radar satellite, enabling it to capture high-resolution images of Earth’s surface regardless of weather conditions, day or night. The satellite features five distinct imaging modes, enabling it to switch between ultra-high-resolution imaging, capable of detecting small objects, and broader scans for large-area observation. The satellite was expected to boost India's space surveillance capabilities and contribute to smarter governance and faster disaster response.It was to be launched into a sun-synchronous orbit (SSO) amidst tension on the India–Pakistan border. Orbit Change Thrusters (OCT) were planned to be used to reduce the orbit altitude of the spent PS4 stage to reduce its life in orbit following by stage passivation.

== Launch failure ==
PSLV-C61 launched from SDSC-SHAR at 5:59 AM IST on Sunday 18 May 2025. The First and Second stages performed normally. A failure of the third stage led to mission failure. Later reports indicated that a drop in chamber pressure of the third stage during its firing led to failure. ISRO's failure analysis committee is expected to release the final failure report within a month.

ISRO Chairman V. Narayanan reported to the media that the FAC committee report has been finalised and submitted to the Prime Minister's Office in August. He announced the return to flight launch of the PSLV Rocket within three months. However the detailed FAC report still remained unpublished before the subsequent PSLV-C62 launch, which likewise ended in failure.

Following the investigation, components of the HPS3, which forms the third stage of the PSLV rocket were re-designed and a modified variant was developed. Two static tests were successfully completed on October 6, 2025 and November 19, 2025 on the stage.

== Mission overview ==
- Mass:
  - Payload weight: 1710 kg
- Overall height: 44.4 m (146 ft)
- Propellant:
  - Stage 1 (PS-1) : Composite Solid (Solid Stage)
  - Stage 2 (PS-2) : Earth Storable Liquid (Liquid Stage)
  - Stage 3 (PS-3): Composite Solid (Solid Stage)
  - Stage 4 (PS-4) : Earth Storable Liquid (Liquid Stage)
- Propellant mass:
  - Stage 1: 139,000 kg (306,000 lb)
  - Stage 2: 41,000 kg (90,000 lb)
  - Stage 3: 7,650 kg (16,870 lb)
  - Stage 4: 1,600 kg (3,500 lb)
- Altitude: 529 km
- Maximum velocity:
- Inclination: 97.6°
- Azimuth: 140°
- Period: 95.2 minutes

== See also ==
- EOS-09
- List of PSLV launches
- ISRO
- RISAT
- PSLV
