= Imaging radar =

Application of radar which is used to create two-dimensional images

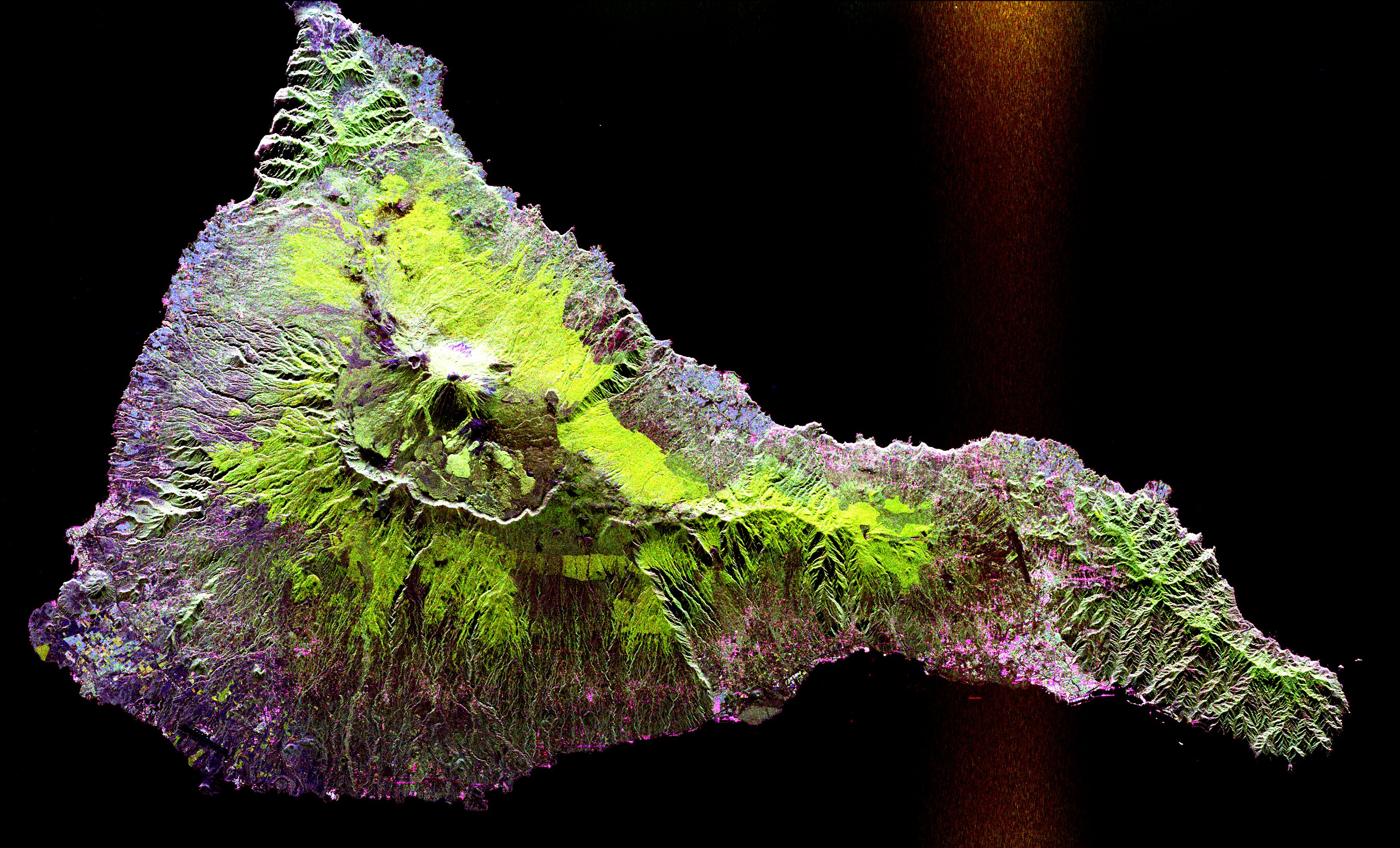
A SAR radar image acquired by the SIR-C/X-SAR radar on board the Space Shuttle Endeavour shows the Teide volcano. The city of Santa Cruz de Tenerife is visible as the purple and white area on the lower right edge of the island. Lava flows at the summit crater appear in shades of green and brown, while vegetation zones appear as areas of purple, green and yellow on the volcano's flanks.

Imaging radar is an application of radar which is used to create two-dimensional images, typically of landscapes. Imaging radar provides its light to illuminate an area on the ground and take a picture at radio wavelengths. It uses an antenna and digital computer storage to record its images. In a radar image, one can see only the energy that was reflected back toward the radar antenna. The radar moves along a flight path and the area illuminated by the radar, or footprint, is moved along the surface in a swath, building the image as it does so.

Digital radar images are composed of many dots. Each pixel in the radar image represents the radar backscatter for that area on the ground (terrain return): brighter areas represent high backscatter, darker areas represents low backscatter.

The traditional application of radar is to display the position and motion of typically highly reflective objects (such as aircraft or ships) by sending out a radiowave signal, and then detecting the direction and delay of the reflected signal. Imaging radar on the other hand attempts to form an image of one object (e.g. a landscape) by furthermore registering the intensity of the reflected signal to determine the amount of scattering. The registered electromagnetic scattering is then mapped onto a two-dimensional plane, with points with a higher reflectivity getting assigned usually a brighter color, thus creating an image.

Several techniques have evolved to do this. Generally they take advantage of the Doppler effect caused by the rotation or other motion of the object and by the changing view of the object brought about by the relative motion between the object and the back-scatter that is perceived by the radar of the object (typically, a plane) flying over the earth. Through recent improvements of the techniques, radar imaging is getting more accurate. Imaging radar has been used to map the Earth, other planets, asteroids, other celestial objects and to categorize targets for military systems.

== Description ==
An imaging radar is a kind of radar equipment which can be used for imaging. A typical radar technology includes emitting radio waves, receiving their reflection, and using this information to generate data. For an imaging radar, the returning waves are used to create an image. When the radio waves reflect off objects, this will make some changes in the radio waves and can provide data about the objects, including how far the waves traveled and what kind of objects they encountered. Using the acquired data, a computer can create a 3-D or 2-D image of the target.

Imaging radar has several advantages. It can operate in the presence of obstacles that obscure the target, and can penetrate ground (sand), water, or walls.

== Time-Frequency Domain techniques ==
Time-Frequency Domain techniques are essential in imaging radar to analyze and process signals that vary in both time and frequency. Radar signals are often non-stationary due to moving targets or environmental changes. Time-Frequency Domain techniques provide insights into how signal characteristics (e.g., frequency) evolve over time, enabling better understanding and extraction of target information.

Common Methods for Time-Frequency Analysis：

Method	Principle	Strengths	Limitations
Short-time Fourier transform	Decomposes the radar signal into time-localized frequency components using short overlapping windows.	Easy to implement and interpret.	Trade-off between time and frequency resolution.
Wavelet Transform	Uses wavelet functions to decompose radar signals into time-scale (frequency) representations.	Multi-resolution capability; suitable for non-stationary signals.	Requires careful selection of wavelet basis.
Hilbert-Huang Transform	Decomposes signals into Intrinsic Mode Functions (IMFs) for instantaneous frequency analysis.	Well-suited for non-linear, non-stationary radar signals.	Computationally intensive and sensitive to noise.
Wigner distribution function	Provides high-resolution time-frequency representation by analyzing signal energy distribution.	High resolution in both time and frequency domains.	Prone to cross-term interference in multi-component signals.

== Applications ==
Applications include: surface topography & coastal change; land use monitoring, agricultural monitoring, ice patrol, environmental monitoring;weather radar- storm monitoring, wind shear warning;medical microwave tomography; through wall radar imaging; 3-D measurements, etc.

=== Through-wall radar imaging ===
Wall parameter estimation uses Ultra Wide-Band radar systems. The handle M-sequence UWB radar with horn and circular antennas was used for data gathering and supporting the scanning method.

=== 3-D measurements ===
3-D measurements are supplied by amplitude-modulated laser radars—Erim sensor and Perceptron sensor. In terms of speed and reliability for median-range operations, 3-D measurements have superior performance.

== Techniques and methods ==
Current radar imaging techniques rely mainly on synthetic aperture radar (SAR) and inverse synthetic aperture radar (ISAR) imaging. Emerging technology utilizes monopulse radar 3-D imaging.

=== Real aperture radar ===
Real aperture radar (RAR) is a form of radar that transmits a narrow angle beam of pulse radio wave in the range direction at right angles to the flight direction and receives the backscattering from the targets which will be transformed to a radar image from the received signals.

Usually the reflected pulse will be arranged in the order of return time from the targets, which corresponds to the range direction scanning.

The resolution in the range direction depends on the pulse width. The resolution in the azimuth direction is identical to the multiplication of beam width and the distance to a target.

==== AVTIS radar ====
The AVTIS radar is a 94 GHz real aperture 3D imaging radar. It uses Frequency-Modulated Continuous-Wave modulation and employs a mechanically scanned monostatic with sub-metre range resolution.

=== Laser radar ===
Laser radar is a remote sensing technology that measures distance by illuminating a target with a laser and analyzing the reflected light.

Laser radar is used for multi-dimensional imaging and information gathering. In all information gathering modes, lasers that transmit in the eye-safe region are required as well as sensitive receivers at these wavelengths.

3-D imaging requires the capacity to measure the range to the first scatter within every pixel. Hence, an array of range counters is needed. A monolithic approach to an array of range counters is being developed. This technology must be coupled with highly sensitive detectors of eye-safe wavelengths.

To measure Doppler information requires a different type of detection scheme than is used for spatial imaging. The returned laser energy must be mixed with a local oscillator in a heterodyne system to allow extraction of the Doppler shift.

=== Synthetic aperture radar (SAR) ===
Synthetic-aperture radar (SAR) is a form of radar which moves a real aperture or antenna through a series of positions along the objects to provide distinctive long-term coherent-signal variations. This can be used to obtain higher resolution.

SARs produce a two-dimensional (2-D) image. One dimension in the image is called range and is a measure of the "line-of-sight" distance from the radar to the object. Range is determined by measuring the time from transmission of a pulse to receiving the echo from a target. Also, range resolution is determined by the transmitted pulse width. The other dimension is called azimuth and is perpendicular to range. The ability of SAR to produce relatively fine azimuth resolution makes it different from other radars. To obtain fine azimuth resolution, a physically large antenna is needed to focus the transmitted and received energy into a sharp beam. The sharpness of the beam defines the azimuth resolution. An airborne radar could collect data while flying this distance and process the data as if it came from a physically long antenna. The distance the aircraft flies in synthesizing the antenna is known as the synthetic aperture. A narrow synthetic beam width results from the relatively long synthetic aperture, which gets finer resolution than a smaller physical antenna.

=== Inverse aperture radar (ISAR) ===
Inverse synthetic aperture radar (ISAR) is another kind of SAR system which can produce high-resolution on two- and three-dimensional images.

An ISAR system consists of a stationary radar antenna and a target scene that is undergoing some motion. ISAR is theoretically equivalent to SAR in that high-azimuth resolution is achieved via relative motion between the sensor and object, yet the ISAR moving target scene is usually made up of non cooperative objects.

Algorithms with more complex schemes for motion error correction are needed for ISAR imaging than those needed in SAR. ISAR technology uses the movement of the target rather than the emitter to make the synthetic aperture. ISAR radars are commonly used on vessels or aircraft and can provide a radar image of sufficient quality for target recognition. The ISAR image is often adequate to discriminate between various missiles, military aircraft, and civilian aircraft.

==== Disadvantages of ISAR ====
1. The ISAR imaging cannot obtain the real azimuth of the target
2. There sometimes exists a reverse image. For example, the image formed of a boat when it rolls forward and backward in the ocean.
3. The ISAR image is the 2-D projection image of the target on the Range-Doppler plane which is perpendicular to the rotating axis. When the Range-Doppler plane and the coordinate plane are different, the ISAR image cannot reflect the real shape of the target. Thus, the ISAR imaging cannot obtain the real shape information of the target in most situations.

Rolling is side to side. Pitching is forward and backward; yawing is turning left or right.

=== Monopulse radar 3-D imaging technique ===
Monopulse radar 3-D imaging technique uses 1-D range image and monopulse angle measurement to get the real coordinates of each scatterer. Using this technique, the image doesn't vary with the change of the target's movement. Monopulse radar 3-D imaging utilizes the ISAR techniques to separate scatterers in the Doppler domain and perform monopulse angle measurement.

Monopulse radar 3-D imaging can obtain the 3 views of 3-D objects by using any two of the three parameters obtained from the azimuth difference beam, elevation difference beam and range measurement, which means the views of front, top and side can be azimuth-elevation, azimuth-range and elevation-range, respectively.

Monopulse imaging generally adapts to near-range targets, and the image obtained by monopulse radar 3-D imaging is the physical image which is consistent with the real size of the object.

=== 4D imaging radar ===
4D imaging radar leverages a Multiple Input Multiple Output (MiMo) antenna array for high-resolution detection, mapping and tracking of multiple static and dynamic targets simultaneously. It combines 3D imaging with Doppler analysis to create the additional dimension – velocity.

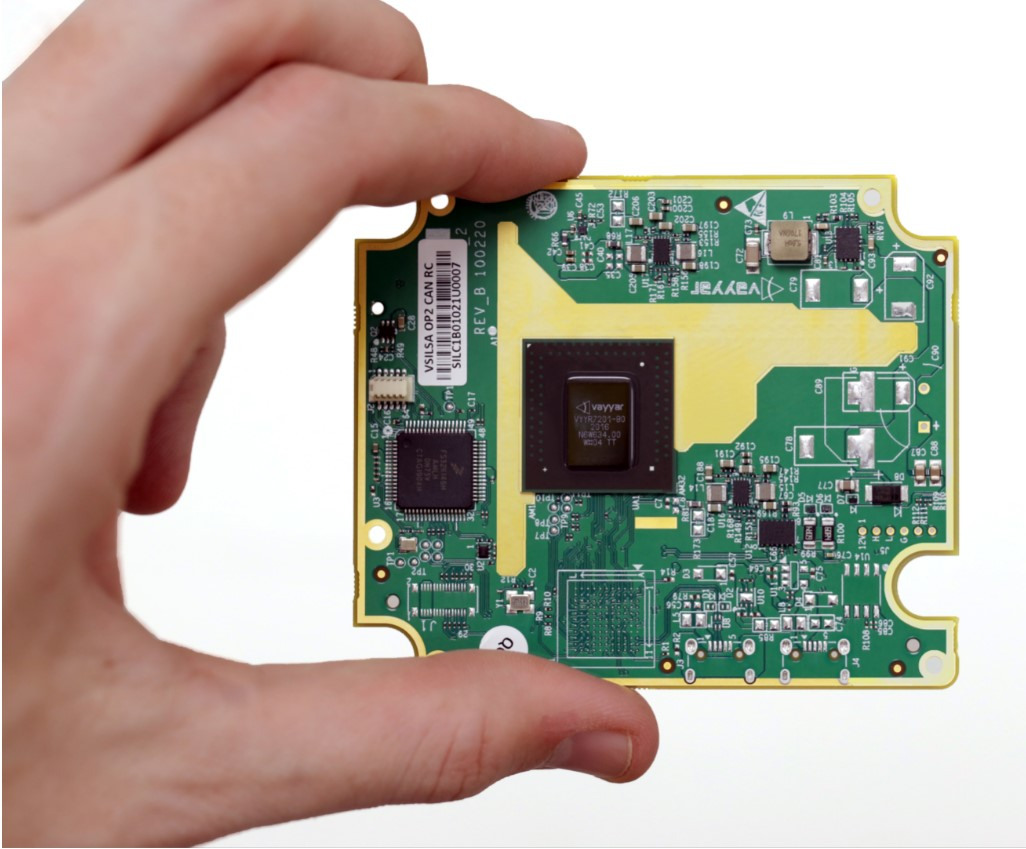
A 60GHz 4D imaging radar sensor from Vayyar Imaging.

A 4D imaging radar system measures the time of flight from each transmitting (Tx) antenna to a target and back to each receiving (Rx) antenna, processing data from the numerous ellipsoids formed. The point at which the ellipsoids intersect – known as a hot spot - reveals the exact position of a target at any given moment.

Its versatility and reliability make 4D imaging radar ideal for smart home, automotive, retail, security, healthcare and many other environments. The technology is valued for combining all the benefits of camera, LIDAR, thermal imaging and ultrasonic technologies, with additional benefits:

- Resolution: the large MiMo antenna array enables accurate detection and tracking of multiple static and dynamic targets simultaneously.
- Cost efficiency: 4D imaging radar costs around the same as a 2D radar sensor, but with immense added value: richer data, higher accuracy and more functionality, while offering an optimal price-performance balance.
- Robustness and privacy: There are no optics involved, so this technology is robust in all lighting and weather conditions. 4D imaging radar does not require line of sight with targets, enabling its operation in darkness, smoke, steam, glare and inclement weather. It also ensures privacy and discreet surveillance by design, an increasingly important concern across all industries.

== See also ==
- Automatic target recognition
- Bistatic imaging
- DSMAC
- Geo warping
- Ground penetrating radar
- Imaging microwave radiometer
- Radar astronomy
- Side looking airborne radar
- Synthetic-aperture radar#Polarimetry
