= SE-2000 =

Indian semi-cryogenic rocket engine

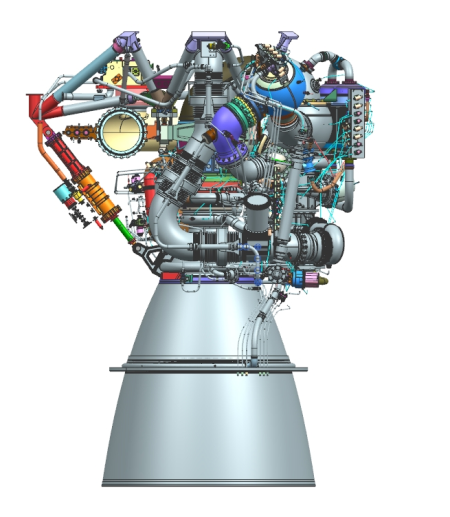
- SE-2000 diagram
- Country of origin: India
- Designer: LPSC; ISRO
- Manufacturer: Godrej & Boyce
- Application: Main engine
- Status: Under Development

Liquid-fuel engine
- Propellant: LOX / RP-1
- Mixture ratio: 2.65
- Cycle: Staged combustion

Configuration
- Chamber: 1

Performance
- Thrust, vacuum: 2,030 kN (460,000 lbf)
- Thrust, sea-level: 1,820 kN (410,000 lbf)
- Throttle range: 60% to 105%
- Chamber pressure: 18 MPa (2,600 psi)
- Specific impulse, vacuum: 335 seconds (3.29 km/s)
- Specific impulse, sea-level: 299 seconds (2.93 km/s)
- Mass flow: 640 kg/s

Dimensions
- Dry mass: ~2700 kg

The SE-2000 (formerly known as SCE-200, also referred as Semi-Cryogenic Engine-2000) is a 2 MN thrust class liquid rocket engine, being developed to power ISRO's existing LVM3 and upcoming heavy and super heavy-lift launch vehicles. It is being developed by the Liquid Propulsion Systems Centre (LPSC) of ISRO, and is expected to have first flight in 2027.

Burning liquid oxygen (LOX) and RP-1 kerosene in an oxidizer-rich staged combustion cycle, the engine will boost payload capacity of LVM3 replacing current L110 stage powered by 2 Vikas engines. It is also expected to power ISRO's future reusable rockets based on RLV technology demonstrations.

The engine was tested on 9 September 2026 on full thrust The use of engine of India's first human spaceflight, hence was ruled out by ISRO. B. The Semi-Cryogenic Engine and Stage Test Facility at the ISRO Propulsion Complex Mahendergiri had ground tests of SE-2000 . This engine is now ready to be used in ISRO rochets like LVM3.

== Background ==
On 2 June 2005, India and Ukraine signed the Framework Agreement between the Government of Ukraine and the Government of the Republic of India on Cooperation in the Peaceful Uses of Outer Space, which would enter in force on 15 February 2006. Agreement also involved the transfer of blueprints for a rocket engine by the Yuzhnoye Design Office. The engine blueprints supposedly transferred by Ukraine to India, have been identified as the RD-810 which in turn is a variant of Russian RD-120.

According to official press release on 26 March 2013, by Ukrainian Ministry of Economic Development and Trade, development of a rocket engine for Indian launch vehicles initiated in 2006 under a joint Indian-Ukrainian project named "Jasmine".

With the SE-2000 and an uprated CE-20, the LVM3's cargo capacity will increase from 4 to 5 tons in GTO. The propellant feeding system of the SE-2000 provide pressures of up to 600 bar, while the chamber pressure is 180 bar.

== History ==
In 2009, SE-2000 program was approved for ₹1,798 crore (US$190 million) and program to develop a 2 MN class main engine began.

During May and June 2015, ISRO and Roscosmos signed a wide-ranging Memorandum of Understanding for cooperation in space. A. S. Kiran Kumar, Chairman of the ISRO, stated that one of the first benefits would be the availability of Russian test stand for initial testing of the SE-2000, while the Semi-cryogenic Integrated Engine Test Facility at Mahendragiri being built. The engine is a part of the ₹1,800 crore (US$190 million) semi-cryogenic launch vehicle program, which would be capable of placing 6,000–10,000 kilograms (13,000–22,000 lb) in GTO. The engine however will not be the part of first flight of Gaganyaan, India's first crewed mission to space, given timelines and schedules.

In 2017, Ukrainian firm Yuzhmash was contracted by ISRO to conduct tests on critical components of SE-2000. First stage of contract was reportedly complete and tests were expected to be completed by 2019. In April 2022, ISRO chairman S. Somanath stated that tests within the country were to begin in next 3 months. By November 2022, the test facility and stand had been nearly ready for engine as well as SC120 stage test which would upgrade India's existing LVM3 rocket.

The intermediate configuration, designated as the Power Head Test Article (PHTA), which includes all engine systems except the thrust chamber, will undergo performance evaluation tests prior to the integrated engine level hot tests. It will serve as an engine prototype for the SE-2000. ISRO chairman V.Narayanan stated in April 2026 hat development of the engine has been accelerated by the Indian Government.

== Development and testing ==
=== Development tests ===
- 10 May 2024: First integrated test of 2000 kN semi-cryogenic engine on an intermediate configuration was conducted at Semi cryogenic Integrated Engine & Stage Test (SIET) facility in ISRO Propulsion Complex (IPRC). During the test, complex chill-down operations were performed to meet necessary conditions for engine start.
- 1 July 2024: First hot test with intermediate configuration of the semi-cryogenic engine, known as Power Head Test Article (PHTA) was conducted at SIET facility. The test proceeded nominally till 1.9 seconds validating the ignition and subsequent performance of PHTA. At 2.0 seconds, an unexpected spike in the turbine pressure and subsequent loss of turbine-speed was observed. The test was terminated mid-way as a precaution. The intended duration of test was 4.5 seconds to validate the performance of the gas generator, turbo pumps, pre-burner and control components with focus on the ignition and hot-gas generation within the pre-burner chamber.
- 2 May 2025: First ignition trial of Pre-burner Ignition Test Article (PITA) was conducted nominally at SIET facility. PITA is a full complement of the engine power head system but without turbo pumps. It was proved that the pre-burner could ignite smoothly and continuously. A start fuel ampule that combines triethylaluminium and triethyleboron created by Vikram Sarabhai Space Centre (VSSC) is used to ignite semi-cryogenic engine and utilized for the first time in ISRO's 2000 kN semi-cryogenic engine. For characterization, injector elemental level ignition tests were carried out at the VSSC Propulsion Research Laboratory Division. Additionally, work is being done on the creation of a semi-cryogenic stage that can load 120 tons of propellant.

=== Hot tests of Power head Test Article (PHTA) ===
- 28 March 2026: PHTA underwent its first successful hot test at the IPRC to validate the propellant feed system's design, comprising the low- and high-pressure turbo-pumps, the pre-burner, the starter system, and the control components. Over the course of the 2.5 seconds test, the engine's seamless ignition and boost strap mode operation were demonstrated. All of the engine parameters were as expected. Before the fully integrated engine is realized, ISRO is further planning a series of tests on PHTA to optimize the performance.
- 24 April 2026: PHTA underwent second hot test for 3.5 second duration, validating the engine start-up sequence and demonstrating stable and controlled performance. In this test, the engine was ignited successfully and operated up to 60% of its rated power level.
- 28 May 2026: PHTA underwent third hot test for 3 second duration, further fine-tuning the engine start-up sequence and demonstrating stable and controlled performance. In this test, the engine was ignited successfully and operated up to 60% of its rated power level.
- 24 June 2026: Eighth PHTA test was carried out at thrust level of 175 tonne (88%) for the first time and also demonstrated the operation of main turbopumps delivering 400 and 500 bar outlet pressures and steady state operation at higher thrust levels.
- 9 September 2026: Ninth PHTA test was carried out at thrust level of 200 tonne (100%) for the first time and the test duration was 35 seconds including operation of the engine powerhead at 200 tonne (100%) thrust level for a duration of 5 seconds. The switch over of propellant supply from a low pressure start tank to medium pressure run tank was also validated in order to enable long duration testing of PHTA in subsequent hot tests..

== Gallery ==
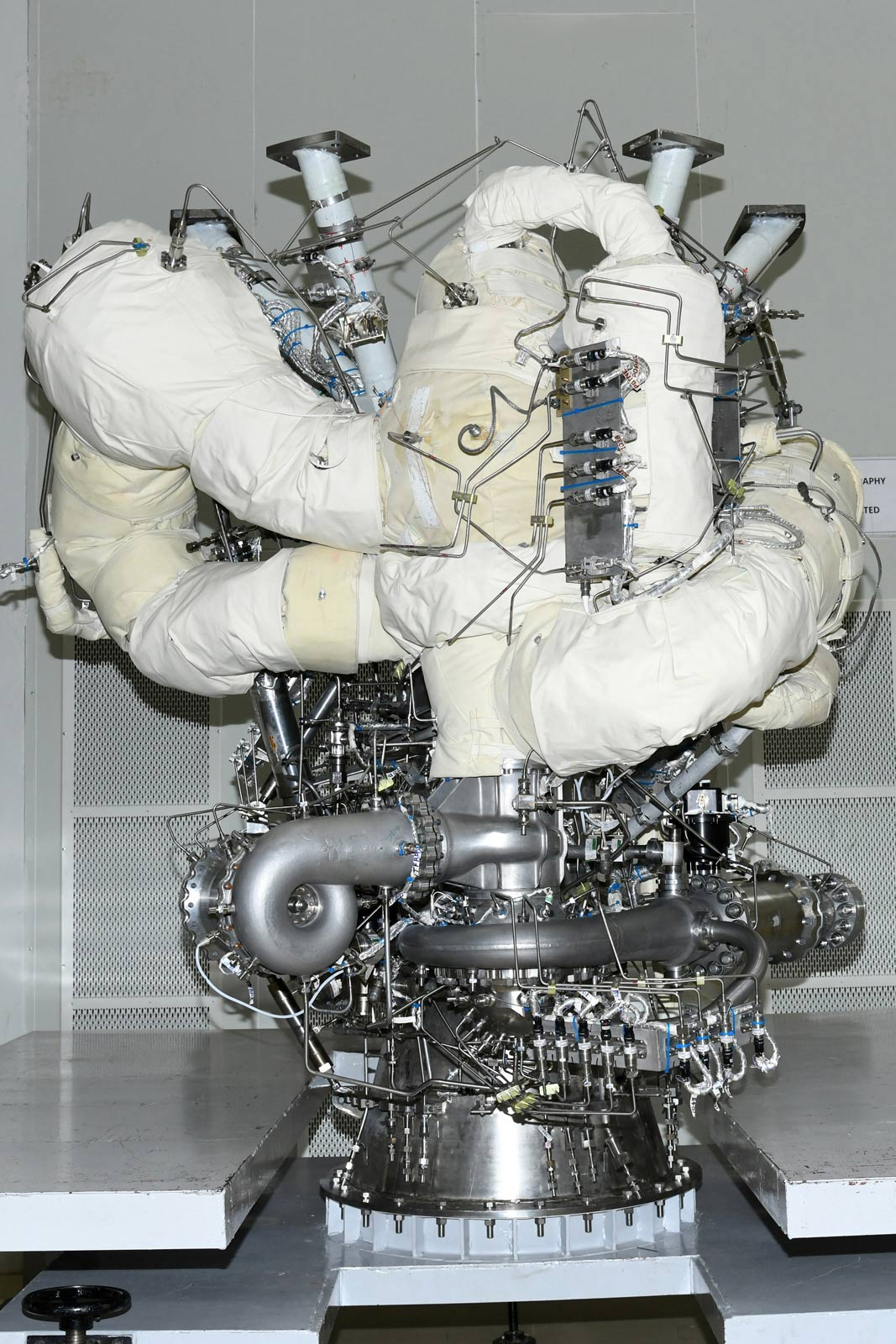
Power Head test article SE-2000

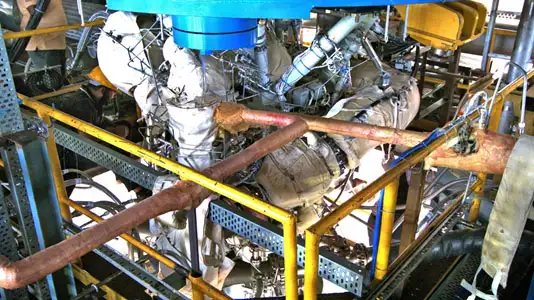
Power Head Test Article.

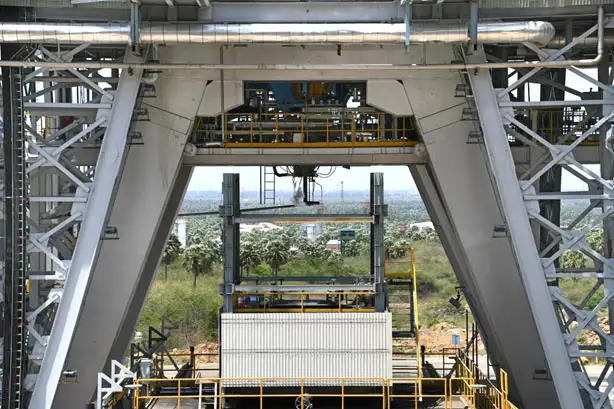
SE-2000 integrated test on an intermediate configuration.

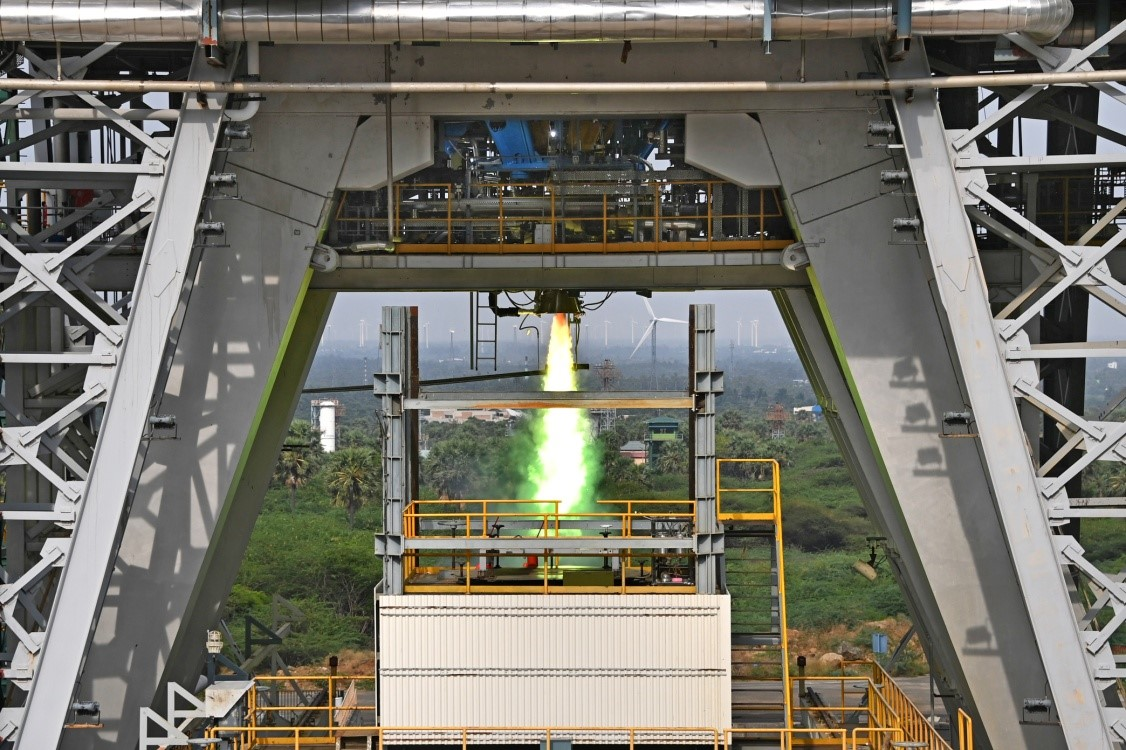
Hot test of Pre-burner Ignition Test Article.

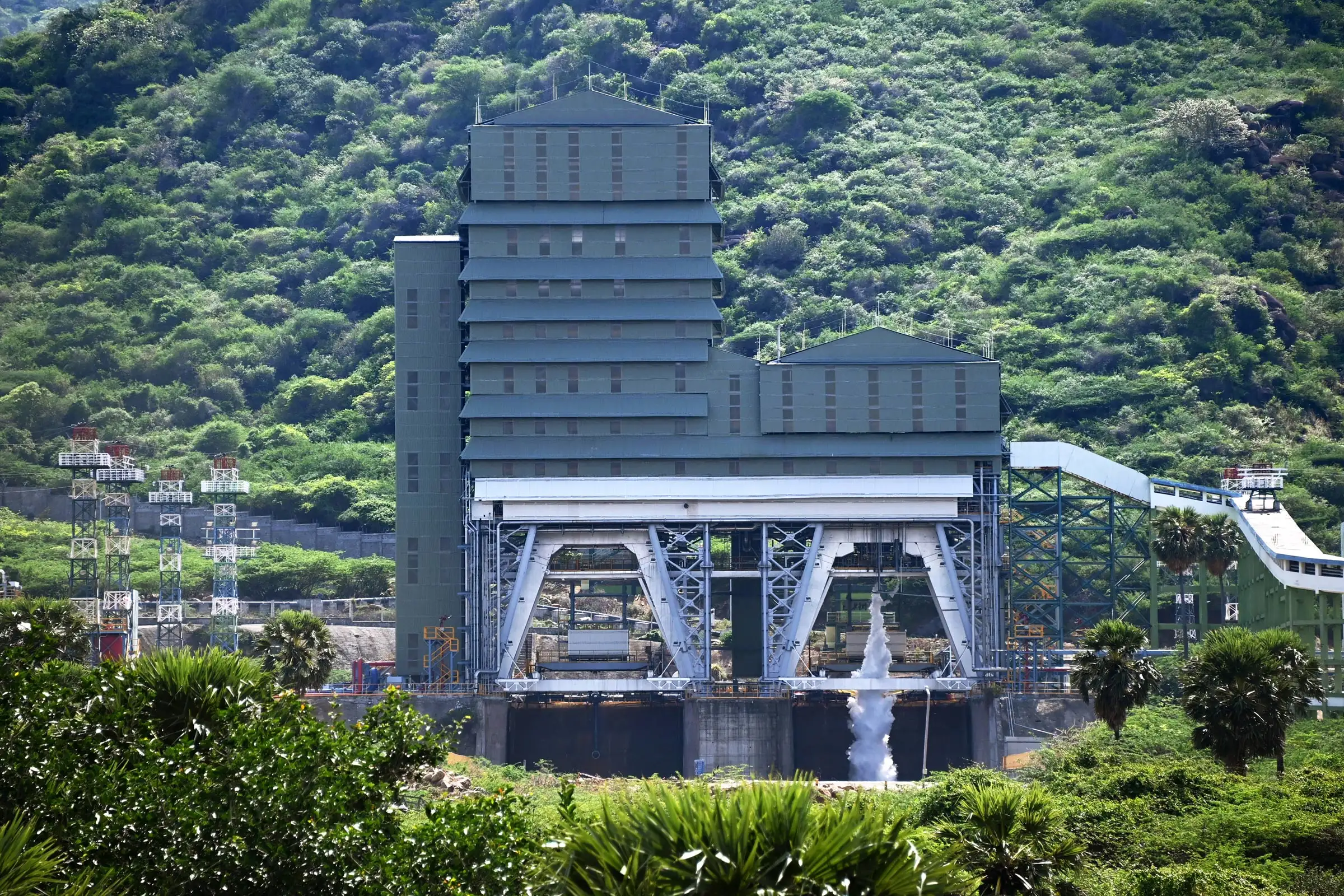
Integrated test of PHTA on an intermediate configuration.

Full thrust hot test of Semicryogenic Engine PHTA

== See also ==
- Liquid Propulsion Systems Centre
- ISRO Propulsion Complex
- LVM3
- Next Generation Launch Vehicle
- Vikas engine
- LME-1100
- RLV-TD Reusable Launch Vehicle Technology Demonstration
- RD-120 – Russian rocket engine on which the SCE-200 is supposedly based.
- RD-810 – Ukrainian rocket engine with very similar characteristics.
- RD-170
- RD-191M
