= Next Generation Launch Vehicle =

Class of Indian partially reusable launch vehicles under development by ISRO

- NGLV, NGLV-H and NGLV-SH
- Function: Medium to Heavy-lift launch vehicle
- Manufacturer: ISRO
- Country of origin: India

Size
- Height: 93 m (305 ft)
- Width: 6.5 m (21 ft)
- Mass: 600 t (590 long tons; 660 short tons) to 1,094 t (1,077 long tons; 1,206 short tons)

Booster stage – S200 Boosters (NGLV-H)
- Height: 25 m (82 ft)
- Diameter: 3.2 m (10 ft)
- Empty mass: 31,000 kg (68,000 lb) each
- Gross mass: 236,000 kg (520,000 lb) each
- Propellant mass: 205,000 kg (452,000 lb) each
- Powered by: Solid S200
- Maximum thrust: 5,151 kN (525.3 tf)
- Total thrust: 10,300 kN (1,050 tf)
- Specific impulse: 274.5 seconds (2.692 km/s) (vacuum)
- Burn time: 128 s
- Propellant: HTPB / AP

First stage – LM470 Core (NGLV/NGLV-H)
- Diameter: 6.5 m (21 ft)
- Propellant mass: 470 t (1,040,000 lb)
- Powered by: 7 LME-1100
- Propellant: LOX / CH_{4}

Second stage – LM120 (NGLV/NGLV-H)
- Diameter: 6.5 m (21 ft)
- Propellant mass: 120 t (260,000 lb)
- Powered by: 3 LME-1100
- Propellant: LOX / CH_{4}

Third stage – C32 (NGLV/NGLV-H)
- Diameter: 6.5 m (21 ft)
- Propellant mass: 32 t (71,000 lb)
- Powered by: 1 CE-20
- Maximum thrust: 216 kN (22.0 tf)
- Specific impulse: 443 seconds (4.34 km/s)
- Propellant: LOX / LH_{2}
- Stages: 3

Capacity

Payload to LEO
- Mass: NGLV: 14 t (31,000 lb) (Reused); 20 t (44,000 lb) (Expended); NGLV-H: 30 t (66,000 lb)

Payload to GTO
- Mass: NGLV: 5 t (11,000 lb) (Reused); 9 t (20,000 lb) (Expended); NGLV-H: 12 t (26,000 lb)

Payload to TLI
- Mass: NGLV: 7 t (15,000 lb); NGLV-H: 10 t (22,000 lb)

Associated rockets
- Comparable: Atlas V; Falcon Heavy; Falcon 9 Block 5; Long March 5B; New Glenn; Proton-M; Vulcan Centaur

Launch history
- Status: Under development
- Launch sites: SDSC TLP
- First flight: 2031 (planned)
- Carries passengers or cargo: Gaganyaan

The Next Generation Launch Vehicle (NGLV) is a family of three-stage partially reusable medium to super heavy-lift launch vehicle, currently under development by ISRO. The family of these vehicles are designed to replace currently operational systems like the PSLV and GSLV. Previously referred to as Unified Launch Vehicle (ULV), it is now known as Project Soorya.

The family consists of three launchers, initially being designed to replace the different core propulsion modules of PSLV, GSLV, and LVM3 respectively with a common semi-cryogenic engine, giving it its original title of ULV. Initial proposals indicated the craft were planned to be expendable. As of October 2022, proposals under the more recent name NGLV suggests they will instead have partial reusability.

Dr S. Sivakumar is the program director for ISRO's Space Transportation System and the project director for NGLV at the Vikram Sarabhai Space Centre (VSSC). In an interview, the former Chairman of ISRO S. Somanath stated that after the integration of the NGLV, all other launch vehicles will be retired, except the LVM3 and the SSLV. The development of the NGLV is projected to take 8 years, having began in December 2024.

== History ==
=== Initial development ===
The NGLV launch system has been in development by ISRO since the early 2010s and has gone through various design changes over time. As ISRO's launch vehicles were ageing, the need for a new generation of launchers with interchangeable modular parts was realised. There have been several design changes since the first proposal.

More than a decade after starting the Cryogenic Upper Stage Project in 1994, ISRO began developing a new semi-cryogenic engine that would be used on its next generation of vehicles of Unified Launch Vehicle (renamed to NGLV), Reusable Launch Vehicle (RLV) and a heavy-lift launcher for future inter-planetary missions. On 22 December 2008, the government approved the development of semi-cryogenic engine technology at an estimated cost of ₹1,798 crore (US$187 million), with a foreign exchange component of ₹588 crore (US$61 million), for the completion of the project by 2014, the engine is named the SE-2000.

In May 2013, the configurations of the launchers were revealed for the first time. They had a common core and upper stage, with four different booster sizes. The core, known as the SC160 (Semi-Cryogenic stage with 160 tonnes of propellant, in the ISRO nomenclature), would have 160,000 kg (350,000 lb) of Kerosene / LOX propellant and be powered by a single SCE-200 (now called the SE-2000) engine. The upper stage, known as the C30 (Cryogenic stage with 30 tonnes of propellant) would have 30,000 kg (66,000 lb) of LH2 / LOX propellant and be powered by a single CE-20 engine.

The four booster options were:

- 6 × S-13, slightly larger than the S-12 on PSLV, to burn longer;
- 2 × S-60, which appears to be a new solid motor development;
- 2 × S-139, which is the first stage of PSLV and GSLV Mk I/II;
- 2 × S-200, like on the LVM3.

==== Heavy-lift variant ====
A potential heavy-lift variant (HLV) of the ULV, in theory was capable of placing up to 10 ton class of spacecraft into Geosynchronous Transfer Orbit. It was planned to include:

- A larger dual S-250 solid strap-on boosters as compared to the S-200 boosters used in LVM3;
- A L-400 semi-cryogenic core stage, with 400 tonnes of propellant, using a cluster of five SCE-200 engines;
- A L-27 cryogenic third stage, with 27 tonnes of propellant, using CE-20 engine;

==== Super-heavy-lift variant ====
A super-heavy-lift variant, was also among the proposals. With multiple SCE-200 engines and side boosters, this variant would have been the most powerful rocket that ISRO had ever developed.

=== Renaming and cabinet approval ===
Dr S.Somanath, the then chairman of ISRO in a public interview conducted by NDTV on 29 June 2024 unveiled a proposal to officially rename the NGLV as "Soorya". He stated that It will be used to help complete the Bharatiya Antariksh Station (BAS) by 2035 and to send an Indian vyomanaut to the moon by 2040.

Under the direction of Prime Minister Narendra Modi, the Union Cabinet approved the development of the Next-Generation Launch Vehicle on September 18, 2024. This move bolsters India's ambition to establish and run the BAS and accomplish a crewed lunar landing by 2040. The NGLV has been approved for ₹8,240 crore (equivalent to ₹88 billion or US$910 million in 2026) in total. It will be implemented over 96 months (8 years) and comprises financing for program administration, facility establishment, and three developmental flights (D1, D2 & D3). It is anticipated that the private space industry would be crucial to the manufacturing and development process, easing the transfer from development to operational status. The development of the NGLV is projected to take another 8 years from December 2024.

Following several months of preliminary planning and design and architectural refinement, ISRO had established a project team in 2024 to begin construction of the NGLV. The third launch pad at Sriharikota will be constructed as the NGLV project, internally named "Soorya," will differ from the current class of rockets in configuration. This was confirmed by ISRO chairman S. Somanath in an exclusive interview with The Times of India. The development of NGLV will involve teams with backgrounds in LVM3, GSLV, PSLV, and SSLV.

=== Development ===
Most design details and engineering aspects for the NGLV had been completed by 2026. Various sub-assemblies were also built and the Structure configuration and vehicle interface drawings had been completed for various stages of the Rocket. Wind tunnel testing with a Core-alone model on a 1:1000 scale is underway, along with Human rating certification.

The First full ignition test of the LME-1100 Gas Generator Cycle engine was carried out on 9 October 2026. More than 70% of the engine components are made through additive manufacturing by industrial partners in India. ISRO is targeting full integration of the engine by June 2027.

== Design ==
ULVs' initial proposals with LVM3 for comparison.

NGLV will have a simple, robust architecture that enables bulk production and modularity in stages, subsystems, and systems for quick turnaround times. It is possible that the NGLV will be a three-stage rocket that runs on green fuel mixes, such as liquid oxygen and kerosene or methane and liquid oxygen for the SCE-200 engine, which runs on an oxidizer-rich closed combustion engine cycle. During the assembly process, the NGLV will be horizontally erected at the launch pad. Several changes are being accommodated in the design of the third launch pad at SDSC for the rocket. The first launch is slated for 2034–2035.

According to former ISRO Chairman S. Somanath, the new rocket has a load capacity of between 20 and 1,215 tonnes. Industry players will handle the production and launches from the outset, with ISRO contributing to the development process.

=== Partial Reusability ===
In Oct 2022 it was initially suggested that the boosters and first stage of NGLV were to be reusable. In June 2023, ISRO revealed that the team working on the NGLV programme had already submitted a preliminary report on the rocket's details, manufacturing process, and approach toward development. The rocket is planned to be partially reusable along with its boosters. The development was expected to take another five to ten years.

ISRO is seeking to add vertical takeoff, vertical landing (VTVL) capability in NGLV first stage and booster stage. Vikram Sarabhai Space Centre is developing advanced navigation system, as well as steerable grid fins, deployable landing legs, and advanced avionics. In order to save costs, the conceptualization, development and testing of new technologies for NGLV will be done on a small-scale vehicle (possibly ADMIRE test vehicle). It will be possible to recover NGLV both on land and in the sea, according to S. Somanath. The recovery landing test will initially take place on land. Later on, a sea test of a similar nature will be conducted.

In April 2026, ISRO issued a tender for fabrication of landing leg hardware for its reusable rocket programme, confirming the inclusion of landing leg hardware on the NGLV and RLV programmes. They are to be developed under the three-phased project ADMIRE over the course off a year with integrated protype development and evaluation. The tender awardee will supply ten flight ready and two ground test units for both programmes.

=== Propulsion technology ===
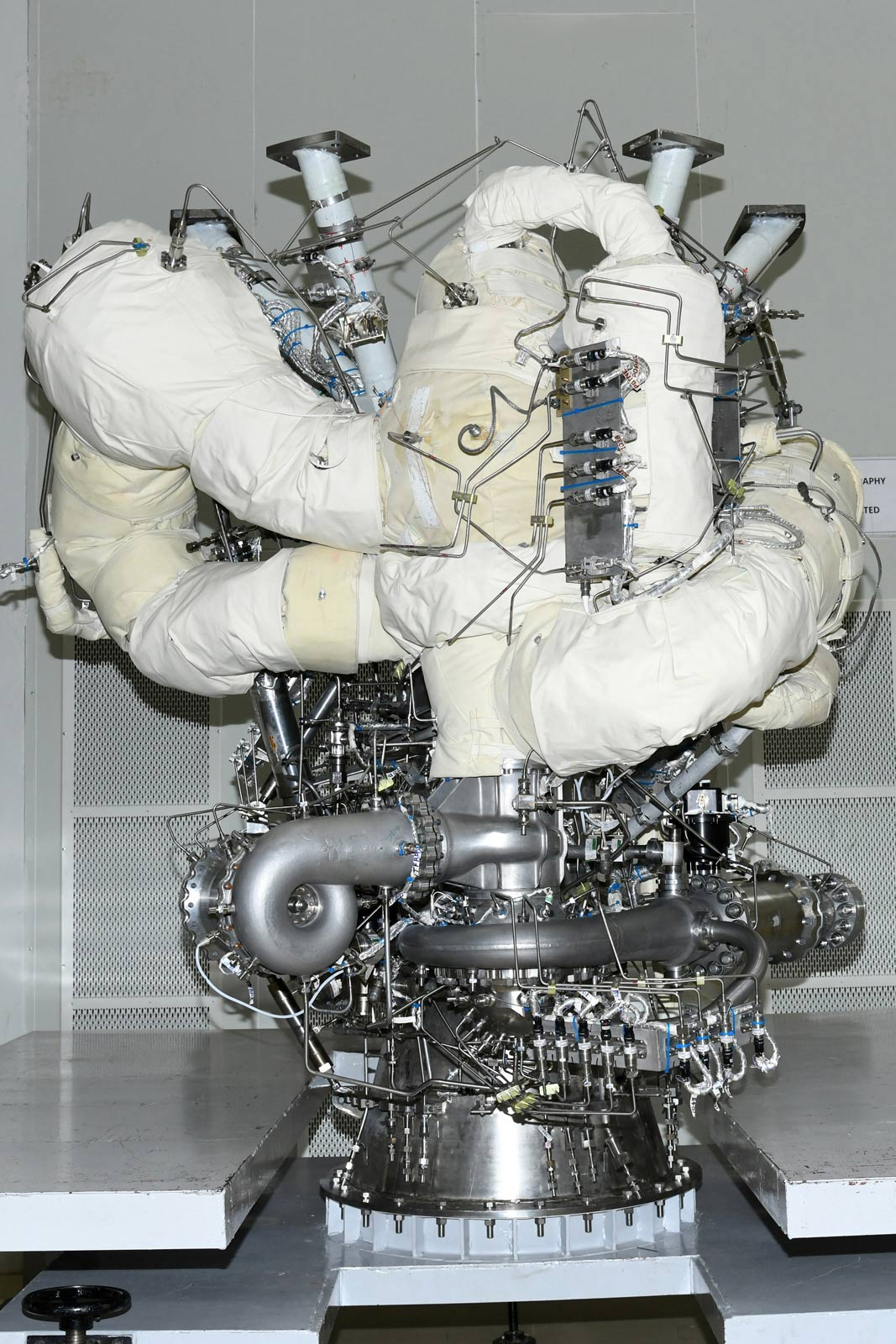
SCE-200 (also referred as Semi-Cryogenic Engine-200) developed by Liquid Propulsion Systems Centre for LVM3 and Next Generation Launch Vehicle.

The development of the SCE-200 engine was completed in 2017 and the tests were contracted to a Ukrainian manufacturer Yuzhmash. In September 2021, in a virtual event being conducted by ISRO, the presentation mentioned a fleet configuration of a family of five rockets capable of lifting from 4.9 tonnes to 16 tonnes to geostationary transfer orbit (GTO). The presentation mentioned the ongoing development of a new semi-cryogenic stage namely SC120 and an upgraded cryogenic stage namely C32. The configurations displayed more powerful engine stages; SC-400 semi-cryogenic stage, C27 cryogenic stage, and S-250 solid rocket boosters.

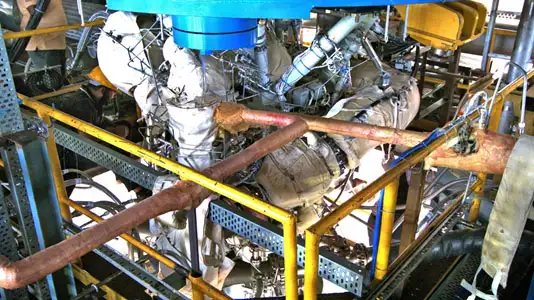
Hot test of SCE-200 Power Head Test Article (PHTA) in intermediate configuration at ISRO Propulsion Complex.

With the aim of sending humans to the moon by 2040, ISRO has begun working on future technology development initiatives. It is expected that thirty tons of payload will be transported using rockets. A Memorandum of Understanding (MoU) was signed on September 4, 2024, by the Raja Ramanna Centre for Advanced Technology (RRCAT) and the LPSC to jointly develop propulsion technology capable of lifting up to 30 tonnes and conveniently transporting bigger payloads to space and the moon. Eighteen to twenty-four months is the maximum time allotted for technology development.

The launch vehicle's engine will use methane and liquid oxygen for propulsion. For engine development, RRCAT will make use of Laser Additive Manufacturing . According to Dr. V. Narayanan, the director of LPSC, Soorya will require a minimum of 25 rocket engines; therefore, the current annual capacity of producing 2-3 engines will be upgraded. The physical construction of the engine will take eight years. Initially, the engine will be utilized to send cargo into orbit. Once the engine passes human-rating certification, Indian astronauts would be able to travel to the moon.

ISRO is working on bringing capabilities for multiple restarts. It will aid in booster stage recovery as well as upper stage mission flexibility. ISRO is developing a spark torch igniter for the future LOX-Methane stages that will have higher ignition reliability and also cleaner combustion products. A sub-scale thrust chamber model was developed and tested by LPSC and IPRC in late-January 2026 to evalute the design for a LOX-Methane engine for induction in the NGLV Programme under the LMSE HT-03 development programme. The LME-1100 engine will be developed with a nominal thrust of 1100kN.

== List of launches ==
Flight No.	Date / time (UTC)	Rocket, Configuration	Launch site	Payload	Payload mass	Orbit	User	Launch Outcome
D1	2031 (TBD)	NGLV	Third	(India) TBA		LEO	ISRO	Planned
D1	Maiden flight of ISRO's Next Generation Launch Vehicle (NGLV).							
D2	2032 (TBD)	NGLV	Third	(India) TBA			ISRO	Planned
D3	2032 (TBD)	NGLV	Third	(India) TBA			ISRO	Planned
D3	The NGLV first stage booster is planned to be recovered in this mission.							
	2033-34 (TBD)	NGLV-H	Third	(India) TBA			ISRO	Planned
Maiden flight of ISRO's Next Generation Launch Vehicle-Heavy (NGLV-H), A Variant of NGLV.
	2033-34 (TBD)	LMLV	Third	(India) TBA			ISRO	Planned
Maiden flight of ISRO's Lunar Module Launch Vehicle (LMLV).
	2033-34 (TBD)	LMLV	Third	(India) Chandrayaan-6			ISRO	Planned
Landing of Same lander as the Crewed Lunar Descent stage.
	2033-34 (TBD)	LMLV	Third	(India) Chandrayaan-7			ISRO	Planned
First of Two Uncrewed End-to-End Lunar Human Landing Demonstration.
	2036-37 (TBD)	LMLV	Third	(India) Chandrayaan-8			ISRO	Planned
Second of Two Uncrewed End-to-End Lunar Human Landing Demonstration.
	2038-39 (TBD)	LMLV	Third	(India) Chandrayaan-H1 Crew Module			ISRO	Planned
Indian first crewed Lunar mission, will orbit the Moon and return.
	2040 (TBD)	LMLV	Third	(India) Chandrayaan-H2 Earth Departure Stage		LEO to Selenocentric	ISRO	Planned
First of two launches for Chandrayaan-H2 Mission, First Indian Crewed landing on the surface of the Moon.
	2040 (TBD)	LMLV	Third	(India) Chandrayaan-H2 Crew Module & Lander Module		LEO to Selenocentric	ISRO	Planned
Second of two launches for Chandrayaan-H2 Mission, First Indian Crewed landing on the surface of the Moon.

== Potential uses and concerns ==
As per a presentation done by S. Somanath at a conference in October 2022, the NGLV might offer launch costs of approximately $1900 per kg of payload in the reusable form and nearly $3000 per kg in the expendable format. The vehicle will also help in meeting India's need of setting up its space station by 2035. Other potential use cases will be in the areas of launching communication satellites, deep space missions, future human spaceflight, and cargo missions. For the 2040 crewed lunar landing mission, ISRO will rely on multiple launches and docking technology rather than building a big rocket.

Somanath also stated that as of now, the demand for such a high end rockets were low as there were very few customers who are required in such high end rockets and rockets are already available in the global market which creates a heavy competition for ISRO with other space agencies and private organisations if such high end rockets were created.

== LMLV ==
Lunar Module Launch Vehicle
- Function: Super heavy-lift launch vehicle
- Manufacturer: ISRO
- Country of origin: India

Size
- Height: 116 m (381 ft)
- Width: 5 m (16 ft)
- Mass: 2,614 t (2,573 long tons; 2,881 short tons)

Boosters stage – LM650 Booster
- Diameter: 5.0 m (16.4 ft)
- Propellant mass: 650 t (1,430,000 lb)
- Powered by: 9 LME-1100
- Propellant: LOX / CH_{4}

First stage – LM650 Core
- Diameter: 5.0 m (16.4 ft)
- Propellant mass: 650 t (1,430,000 lb)
- Powered by: 7 LME-1100
- Propellant: LOX / CH_{4}

Second stage – LM200
- Diameter: 5.0 m (16.4 ft)
- Propellant mass: 200 t (440,000 lb)
- Powered by: 3 LME-1100
- Propellant: LOX / CH_{4}

Third stage – C70
- Diameter: 5.0 m (16.4 ft)
- Propellant mass: 70 t (150,000 lb)
- Powered by: 1 CE-20
- Maximum thrust: 216 kN (22.0 tf)
- Specific impulse: 443 seconds (4.34 km/s)
- Propellant: LOX / LH_{2}
- Stages: 3

Capacity

Payload to LEO
- Mass: 75 t (165,000 lb)

Payload to GTO
- Mass: 24 t (53,000 lb)

Payload to TLI
- Mass: 26 t (57,000 lb)

Associated rockets
- Comparable: Falcon Heavy; Long March 10; New Glenn; Space Launch System; Yenisei

Launch history
- Status: Under development
- Launch sites: SDSC TLP
- First flight: 2031 (planned)
- Carries passengers or cargo: Gaganyaan

The Lunar Module Launch Vehicle (LMLV) is a three-stage partially reusable super heavy-lift launch vehicle, currently under development by ISRO. LMLV is planned to be used in Indian Lunar Human Spaceflight Mission.It is presumed to be a super-heavy lift variant of the NGLV.

=== FFSCC Engine ===
In October 2026, ISRO announced it has completed design of 2400kN LOX-Methane FFSCC engine for future heavy lift human rated launch vehicle for crewed landings on the moon.

== See also ==
- Launch vehicles of ISRO
- LVM3
- RLV Technology Demonstration Programme
- Small Satellite Launch Vehicle
- Reusable launch vehicle
