= Launch vehicles of ISRO =

Launch vehicles developed and operated by ISRO

ISRO manufactures launch vehicles to execute its various space exploration goals. ISRO operates multiple launch vehicles such as the PSLV, the GSLV, the LVM3, and the SSLV.

== Launch vehicles ==
=== Polar Satellite Launch Vehicle ===
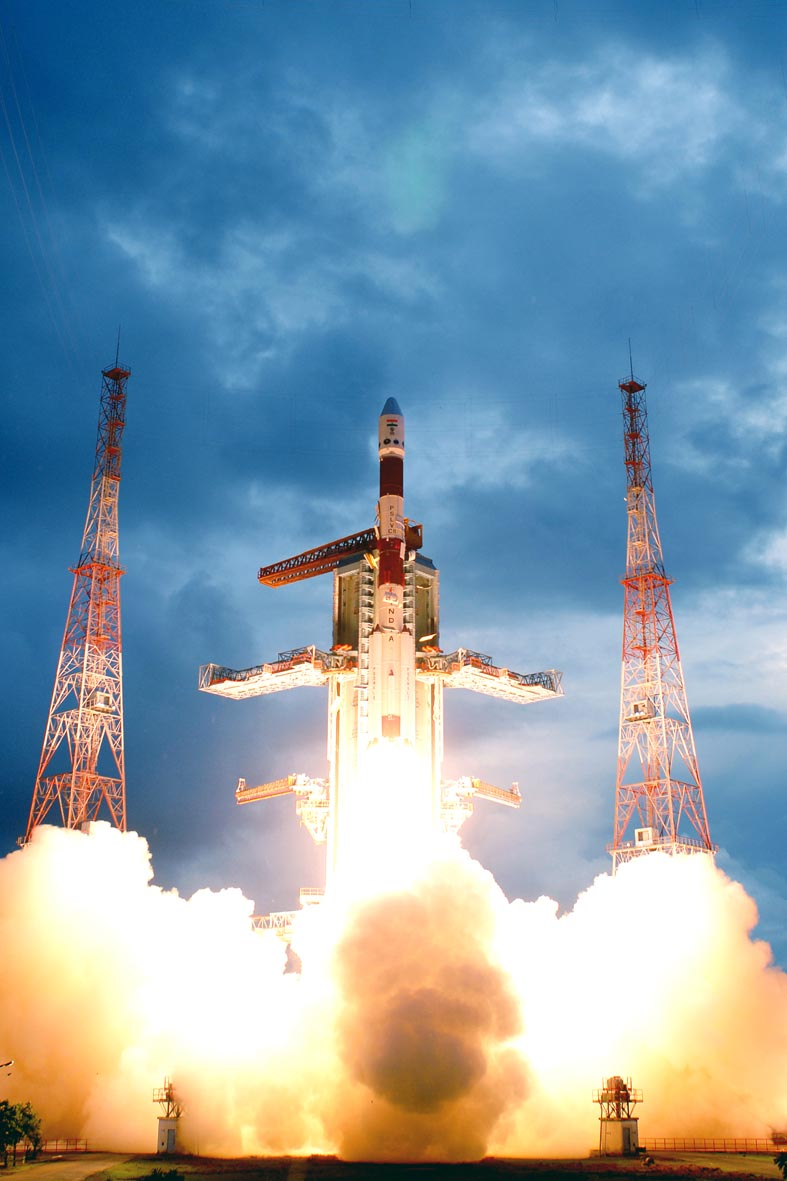
PSLV-C11 lifts off carrying Chandrayaan-1, the first Indian mission to the moon.

Status: Active

The Polar Satellite Launch Vehicle or PSLV is the first medium-lift launch vehicle from India which enabled India to launch all its remote-sensing satellites into Sun-synchronous orbit. PSLV had a failure in its maiden launch in 1993. Besides two other partial failures, PSLV has become the primary workhorse for ISRO with more than 50 launches placing hundreds of Indian and foreign satellites into orbit.

Decade-wise summary of PSLV launches
| Decade | Successful | Partial success | Failure | Total |
|---|---|---|---|---|
| 1990s | 3 | 1 | 1 | 5 |
| 2000s | 11 | 0 | 0 | 11 |
| 2010s | 33 | 0 | 1 | 34 |
| 2020s | 10 | 0 | 2 | 12 |
| Total | 57 | 1 | 4 | 62 |

=== Geosynchronous Satellite Launch Vehicle ===
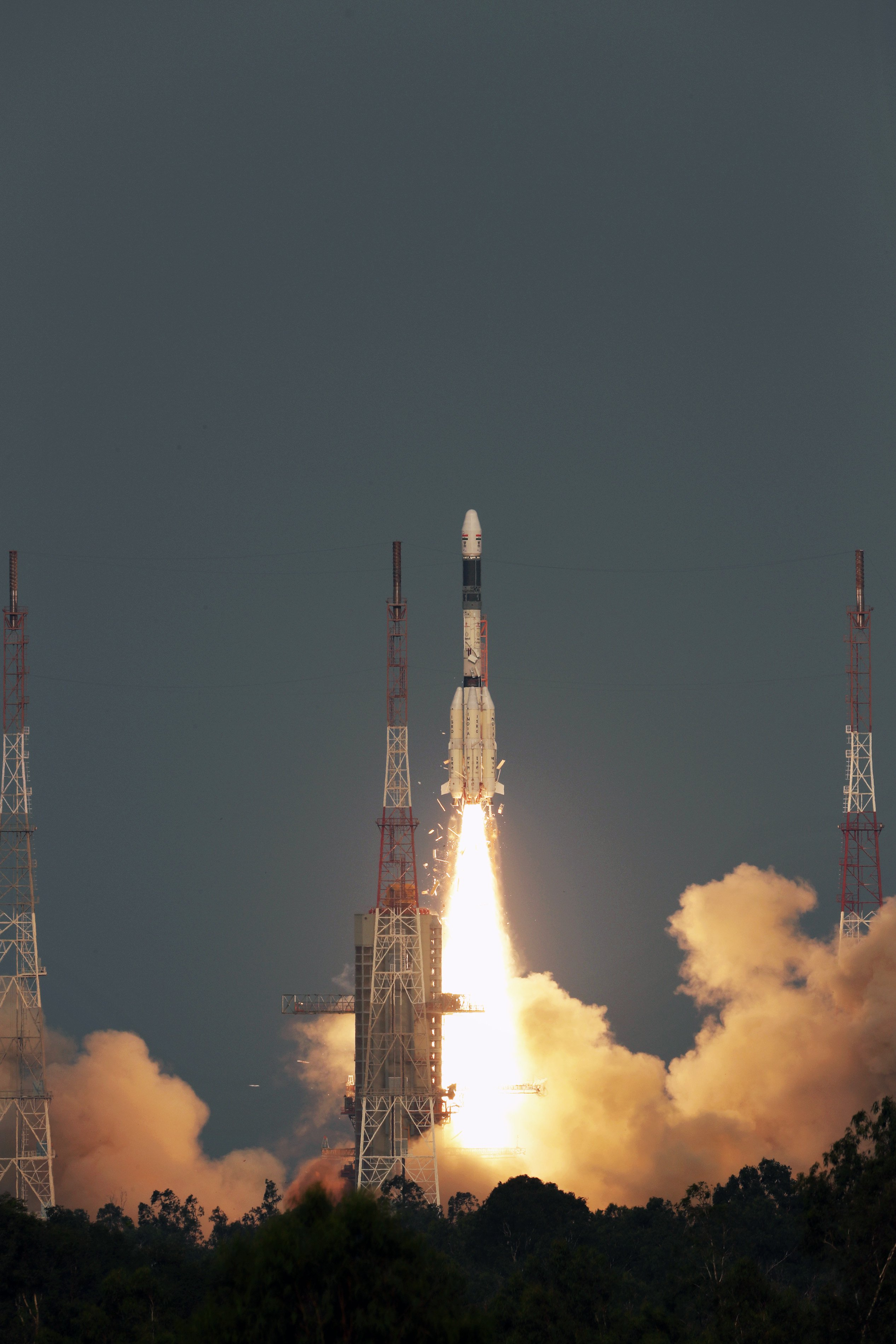
GSLV-F08 launches GSAT-6A into geostationary transfer orbit in 2018.

Status: Active

The Geosynchronous Satellite Launch Vehicle is a medium-lift launch vehicle which was envisaged in 1990s to transfer significant payloads to geostationary orbit. ISRO initially had a great problem realising GSLV as the development of CE-7.5 in India took a decade. The US had blocked India from obtaining cryogenic technology from Russia, leading India to develop its own cryogenic engines.

Decade-wise summary of GSLV Launches
| Decade | Successful | Partial success | Failure | Total |
|---|---|---|---|---|
| 2000s | 2 | 2 | 1 | 5 |
| 2010s | 6 | 0 | 2 | 8 |
| 2020s | 6 | 0 | 1 | 7 |
| Total | 14 | 2 | 4 | 20 |

=== Launch Vehicle Mark-3 ===
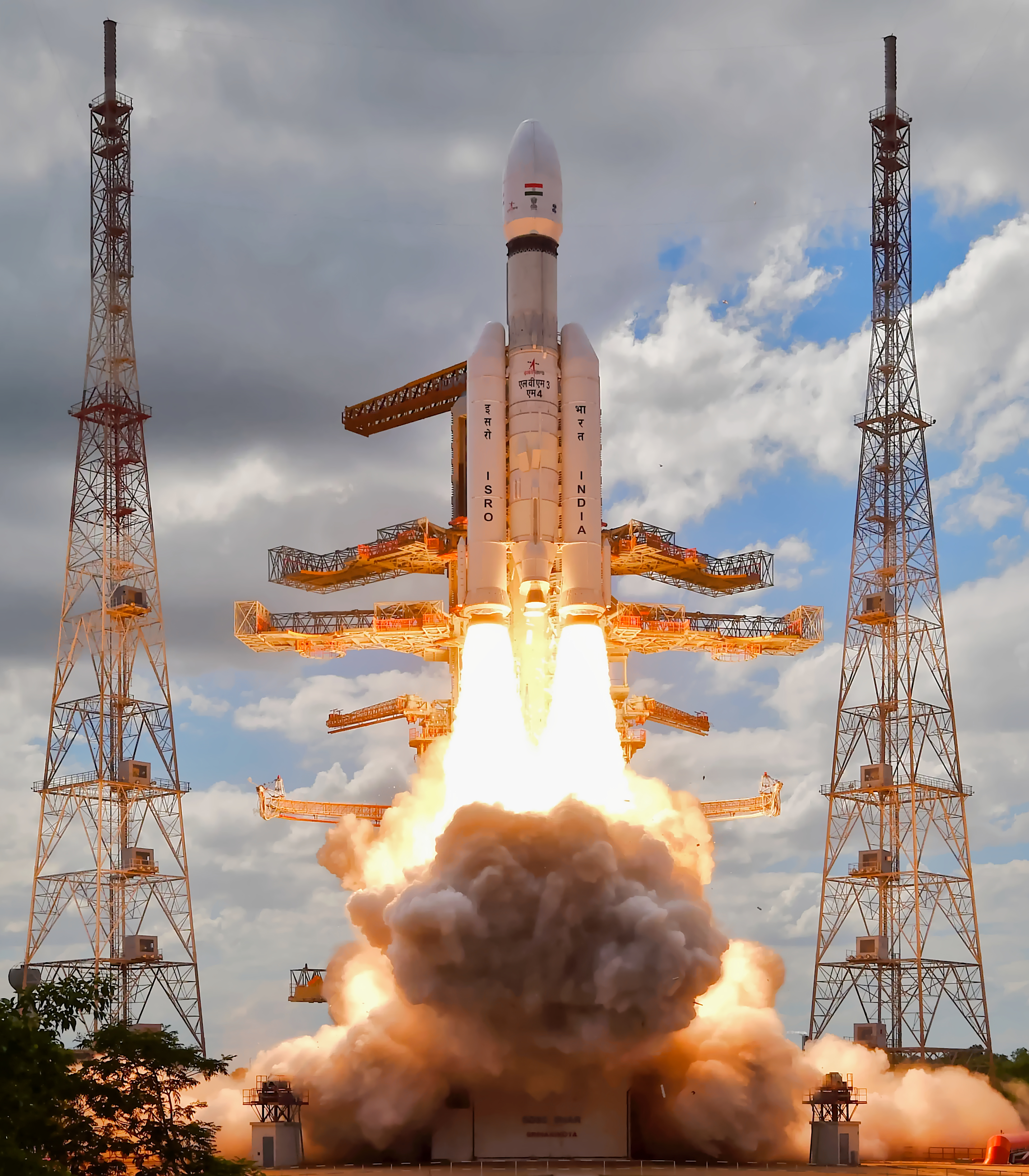
LVM3 M4 lifting off from SDSC SLP in 2023, carrying Chandrayaan-3.

Status: Active

The Launch Vehicle Mark-3 (LVM3), previously known as the GSLV Mk III, is a medium-lift launch vehicle and the heaviest rocket in operational service with ISRO. Equipped with a more powerful cryogenic engine and boosters than GSLV, it has significantly higher payload capacity and allows India to launch all its communication satellites. LVM3 is expected to carry India's first crewed mission to space and will be the testbed for SE-2000 engine which will power India's heavy-lift rockets in the future.

Decade-wise summary of LVM3 launches
| Decade | Successful | Partial success | Failure | Total |
|---|---|---|---|---|
| 2010s | 4 | 0 | 0 | 4 |
| 2020s | 5 | 0 | 0 | 5 |
| Total | 9 | 0 | 0 | 9 |

=== Small Satellite Launch Vehicle ===
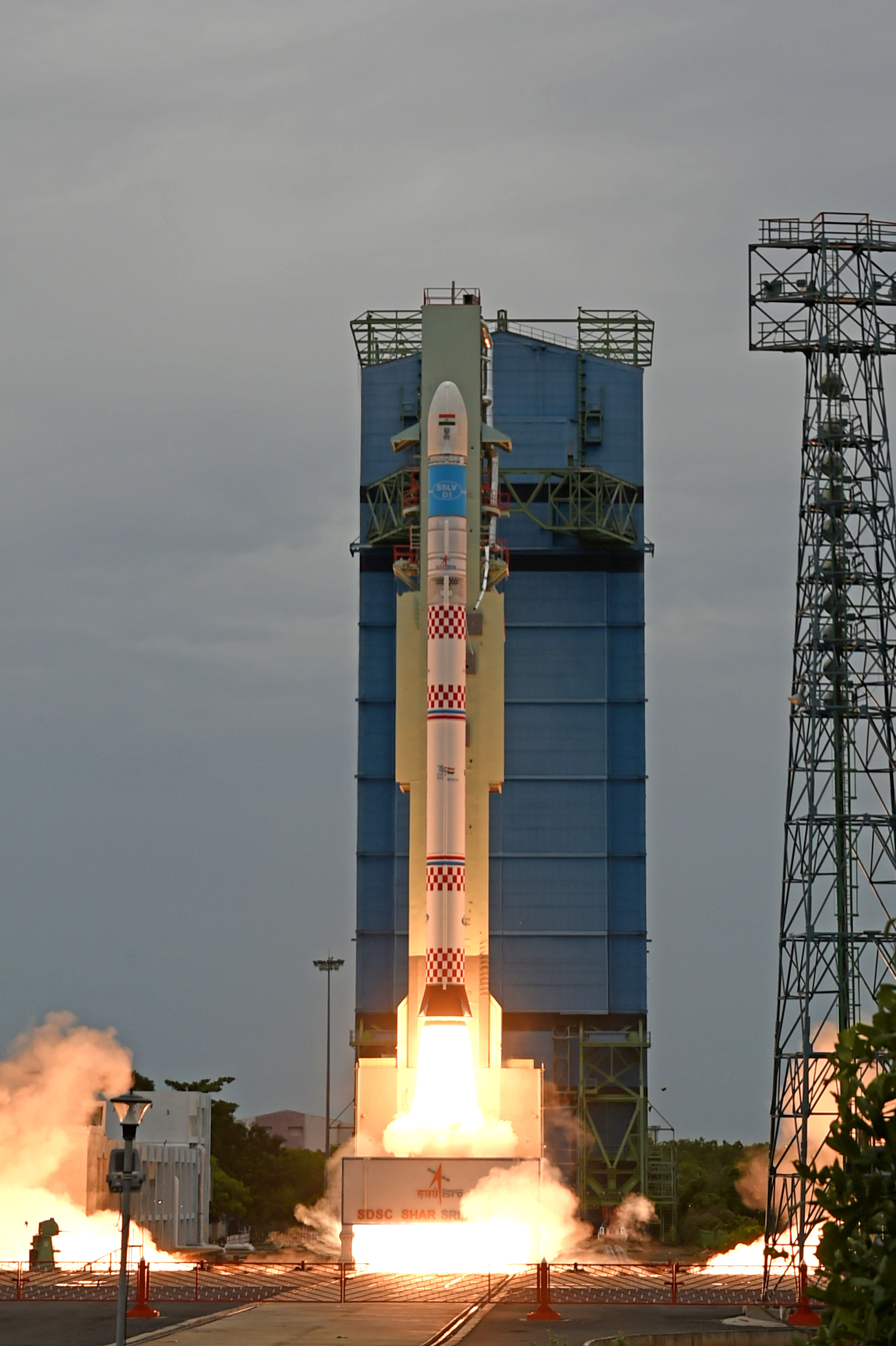
SSLV D1 lifting off from SDSC FLP

Status: Active

The Small Satellite Launch Vehicle (SSLV) is a small-lift launch vehicle developed by the ISRO with payload capacity to deliver 500 kg (1,100 lb) to low Earth orbit (500 km (310 mi)) or 300 kg (660 lb) to Sun-synchronous orbit (500 km (310 mi)) for launching small satellites, with the capability to support multiple orbital drop-offs.

Decade-wise summary of SSLV launches
| Decade | Successful | Partial success | Failure | Total |
|---|---|---|---|---|
| 2020s | 2 | 0 | 1 | 3 |

== In development ==
=== Next Generation Launch Vehicle ===
NGLV, NGLV-H and NGLV-SH

ISRO's current launch vehicles lack the capacity for launching very heavy satellites to the geostationary orbit beyond 4 ton class, a problem that is planned to be fixed with the introduction of the NGLV. ISRO is studying heavy (HLV) and super heavy-lift launch vehicle (SHLV). Modular launchers are being designed, with interchangeable parts, to reduce production time. A 10-tonne (11-short-ton; 9.8-long-ton) capacity HLV and an SHLV capable of delivering 50–100 tonnes (55–110 short tons; 49–98 long tons) into orbit have been mentioned in statements and presentations from ISRO officials.

== Retired ==
=== Satellite Launch Vehicle ===
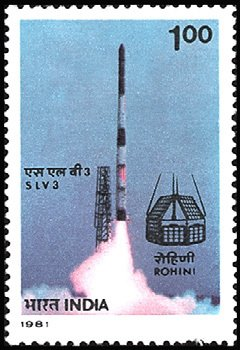
A stamp depicting SLV-3 D1 carrying RS-D1 satellite to orbit

Status: Retired

The Satellite Launch Vehicle (known as SLV-3) was the first space rocket to be developed by India. The initial launch in 1979 was a failure followed by a successful launch in 1980 making India the sixth country in world with orbital launch capability. The development of bigger rockets began afterwards.

=== Augmented Satellite Launch Vehicle ===
The Augmented Satellite Launch Vehicle

Status: Retired

The Augmented or Advanced Satellite Launch Vehicle (ASLV) was another small launch vehicle released in 1980s to develop technologies required to place satellites into geostationary orbit. ISRO did not have adequate funds to develop ASLV and PSLV at once. Since ASLV suffered repeated failures, it was dropped in favour of a new project.

== Sounding rockets ==
=== Rohini sounding rockets ===
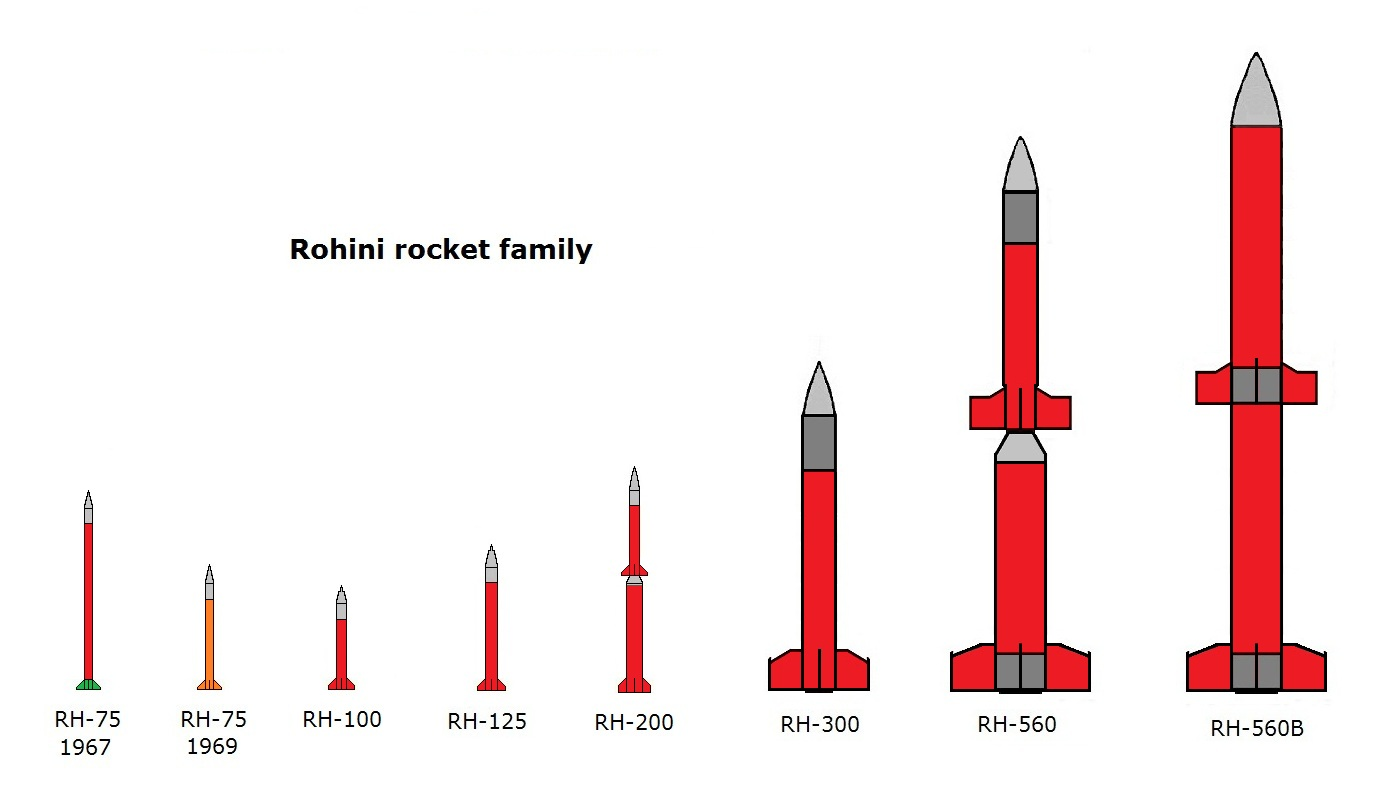
A comparison of Rohini sounding rockets.

Status: Active

Rohini is a series of sounding rockets developed by ISRO for meteorological and atmospheric study. These sounding rockets are capable of carrying payloads of 2 to 200 kilograms (4.4 to 440.9 lb) between altitudes of 100 to 500 kilometres (62 to 311 mi). The ISRO currently uses RH-200, RH-300, Mk-II, RH-560 Mk-II and RH-560 Mk-III rockets, which are launched from the Thumba Equatorial Rocket Launching Station (TERLS) in Thumba and the SDSC in Sriharikota.

=== Advanced Technology Vehicle ===
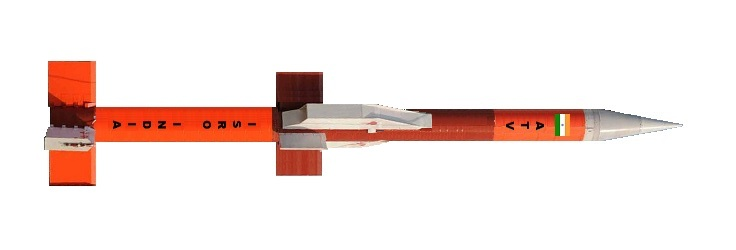
The Advanced Technology Vehicle

Status: Active

The Advanced Technology Vehicle is a modified Indian sounding rocket developed by ISRO. It is based on the Rohini-560 sounding rocket. The ATV programme was created to test the development of a native dual-mode air-breathing scramjet engine. As of 2016, ISRO has flown two test missions.

== See also ==
- List of PSLV launches
- List of GSLV launches
- List of LVM3 launches
- List of SSLV launches
