= CE-7.5 =

Cryogenic rocket engine developed by the Indian Space Research Organisation

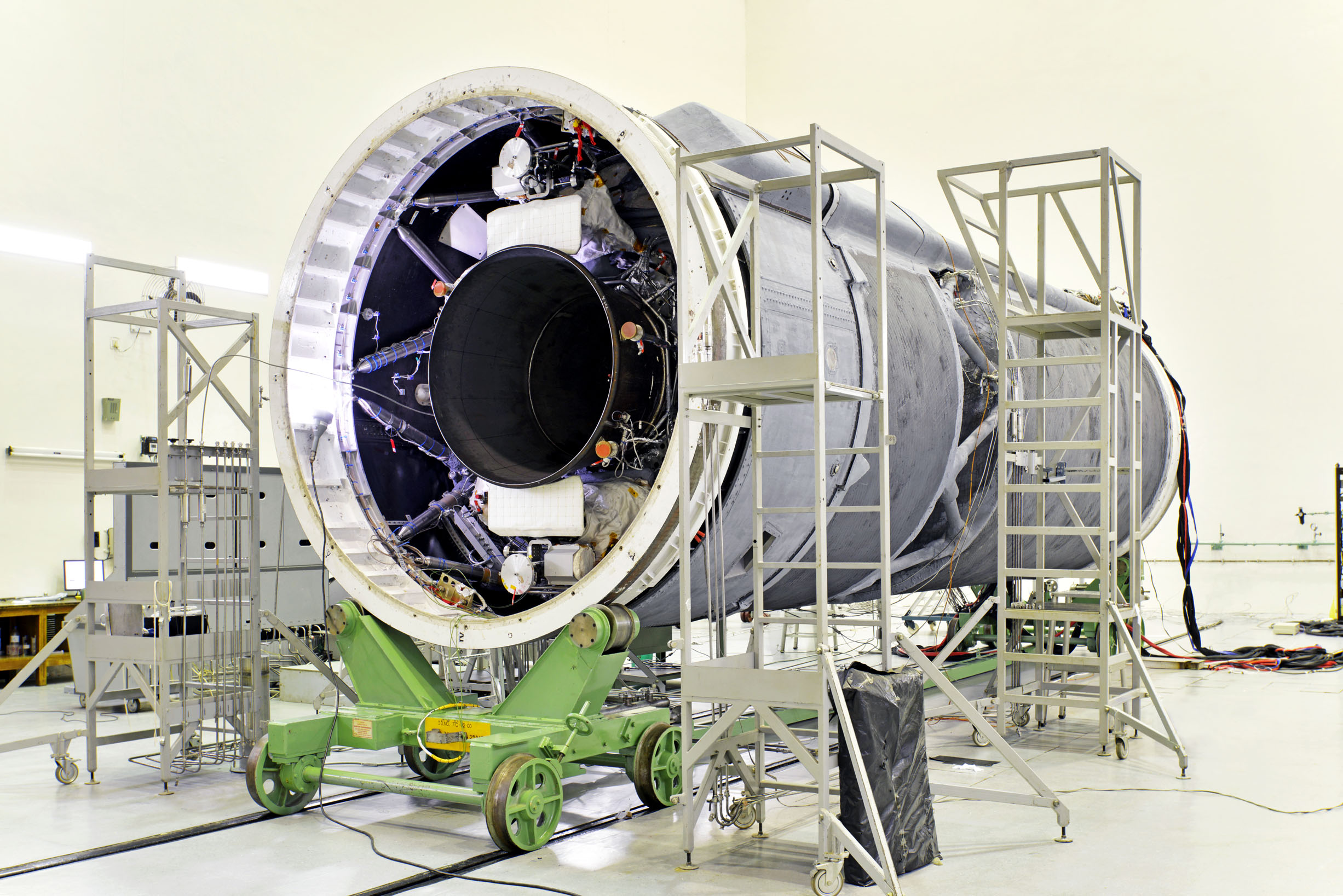
- The CUS15 upper stage of GSLV-F09 powered by the CE-7.5 engine at Stage Preparation Facility
- Country of origin: India
- First flight: 15 April 2010 (failure); 5 January 2014 (success)
- Designer: ISRO; LPSC
- Manufacturer: ISRO; HAL
- Application: Upper-stage booster
- Status: In use

Liquid-fuel engine
- Propellant: LOX / LH2
- Cycle: Fuel-rich staged combustion

Configuration
- Chamber: 1

Performance
- Thrust, vacuum: 73.5 kN (16,500 lbf)
- Chamber pressure: 5.8 MPa (58 bar) / 7.5 MPa (75 bar)
- Specific impulse, vacuum: 454 seconds (4.45 km/s)

Dimensions
- Length: 2.14 m (7.0 ft)
- Diameter: 1.56 m (5.1 ft)
- Dry mass: 435 kg

Used in
- Upper stage of GSLV

The CE-7.5 is a cryogenic rocket engine developed by ISRO to power the upper stage of its GSLV Mk-2 launch vehicle. The engine was developed as a part of the Cryogenic Upper Stage Project (CUSP). It replaced the KVD-1 (RD-56) Russian cryogenic engine that powered the upper stage of GSLV Mk-1.

== Overview ==
CE-7.5 is a regeneratively-cooled, variable-thrust, fuel-rich staged combustion cycle rocket engine.

== Specifications ==
The specifications and key characteristics of the engine are:

- Operating Cycle – Staged combustion
- Propellant Combination – LOX / LH_{2}
- Maximum thrust (Vacuum) – 73.55 kN
- Operating Thrust Range (as demonstrated during GSLV Mk2 D5 flight) – 73.55 kN to 82 kN
- Engine Specific Impulse - 454 ± 3 seconds (4.452 ± 0.029 km/s)
- Engine Burn Duration (Nom) – 720 seconds
- Propellant Mass – 12,800 kg
- Two independent regulators: thrust control and mixture ratio control
- Steering during thrust: provided by two gimballed steering engines

== Development ==
ISRO formally started the Cryogenic Upper Stage Project in 1994. The engine successfully completed the Flight Acceptance Hot Test in 2008, and was integrated with propellant tanks, third-stage structures and associated feed lines for the first launch. The first flight attempt took place in April 2010 during the GSLV Mk.II D3/GSAT-3 mission. The engine ignited, but the ignition did not sustain as the Fuel Booster Turbo Pump (FBTP) shut down after reaching a speed of about 34,500 rpm 480 milliseconds after ignition, due to the FBTP being starved of Liquid Hydrogen (LH2). On 27 March 2013 the engine was successfully tested under vacuum conditions. The engine performed as expected and was qualified to power the third stage of the GSLV Mk-2 rocket. On 5 January 2014 the cryogenic engine performed successfully and launched the GSAT-14 satellite in the GSLV-D5/GSAT-14 mission.

To aid in the development of NGLV, technologies for multiple restart and development of a spark torch igniter was conducted on the Vernier engine of the GSLV CUS in March 2025.

== Applications ==
CE-7.5 is being used in the third stage of ISRO's GSLV Mk.II rocket.

== See also ==
- CE-20
- SE-2000
- LME-1100
- LVM3
- NGLV
