= LME-1100 =

Indian rocket engine under development

- Country of origin: India
- Designer: LPSC, ISRO
- Status: In Development

Liquid-fuel engine
- Propellant: LOX / Methane
- Cycle: Gas Generator

Performance
- Thrust, vacuum: 1,100 kN (250,000 lb_{f})

Used in
- NGLV

The LME-1100 is an under-development liquid-fueled rocket engine, burning liquid oxygen and liquid methane. It is being developed by the Liquid Propulsion Systems Center and will be used on future launch vehicles of ISRO such as the NGLV. As of 2026, The design and development phase of this engine is nearing completion. The LME-1100 engine will be developed with a nominal thrust of 1100 kN.

== Background ==
The LME-1100 is being developed for the Next Generation Launch Vehicle (NGLV), a project approved by India's Union Cabinet. The NGLV is designed to carry up to 30 tonnes to low Earth orbit, with a reusable first stage, and ISRO says it will offer three times the payload capability of the LVM3 at about 1.5 times the cost. According to the Liquid Propulsion Systems Centre (LPSC), which has a key role in developing both the engine and the stages, the NGLV's first stage, called LM450 (NS1), is planned to consist of nine clustered LME-1100 engines. The second stage, LM120 (NS2), is to use two engines, and the third is the C32 cryogenic stage (NS3). ISRO describes the vehicle as a significant step toward operating the Bharatiya Antariksh Station and toward an Indian crewed landing on the Moon by 2040.

== History ==
In 2019 and 2020, a LH/LOX cryogenic CE-20 Engine was modified into using Methalox propellants as development perquisite of the LME-1100. This engine was called the LM20-TD engine. modifications were carried out in the propellant flow control system and the engine start-up systems. The LM-20-TD also operated on the gas generator cycle with major subsystems derived from the LOX/LH2 CE-20. One cold flow test and five hot tests were carried out successfully at IPRC. ISRO has developed a spark torch igniter for the LOX-Methane engine that will have higher ignition reliability and also cleaner combustion products. A sub-scale thrust chamber model was developed and tested by LPSC and IPRC in late-January 2026 to evaluate the design for a LOX-Methane engine for induction in the NGLV Programme under the LMSE HT-03 development programme.

The First full ignition test of the LME-1100 Gas Generator Cycle engine was carried out on 9 October 2026. More than 70% of the engine components were made through additive manufacturing by industrial partners in India. ISRO is targeting full integration of the engine by June 2027. The engine is expected to support NGLV payload capacity to send up to 30 tonnes of payload to Lunar orbit, supporting potential crewed missions. LPSC has consulted Raja Ramanna Advanced Technology Centre for technological implements on engine development.

== Propellant ==
ISRO chose methane because it offers a balance between performance, storage requirements and potential reusability, and a combination of liquid oxygen and liquid methane could support more cost-effective operations and ease the development of future reusable launch systems. Methane is denser than liquid hydrogen and needs less tank volume, although it still has to be stored at cryogenic temperatures, and scientists have noted that the engine needs extensive testing to demonstrate reliable operation before it can fly on a launch vehicle.

ISRO began developing the engine's key technologies in 2023. Tests so far have produced data on chill-down characteristics, thrust chamber and gas generator ignition, engine starting, combustion and rotordynamic performance for a LOX-methane engine. The first ignition test of the full-scale gas generator on 9 October 2026 was described as a significant step toward integrating the complete engine, which is slated for 2027.

== See also ==
- SE-2000
- Vikas
- SpaceX Raptor
- Rocket Lab Archimedes
