= Raja Ramanna Centre for Advanced Technology =

Indian research institute

- Abbreviation: RRCAT
- Formation: 19 February 1984
- Purpose: Physics
- Headquarters: Indore, Madhya Pradesh
- Location: India
- Coordinates: 22.667°N 75.809°E
- Parent organisation: Department of Atomic Energy
- Website: www.rrcat.gov.in

The Raja Ramanna Centre for Advanced Technology is a unit of the Department of Atomic Energy, Government of India, engaged in research and development (R&D) in non-nuclear front-line research areas such as lasers, particle accelerators and related technologies.

== History ==
On 19 February 1984 the then President of India, Gyani Zail Singh, laid the foundation stone of the centre. Construction of laboratories and houses began in May 1984. In June 1986, the first batch of scientists from the Bhabha Atomic Research Centre (BARC), Mumbai, moved to RRCAT and scientific activities were started. Since then, the centre has rapidly grown into a premier institute for research and development in lasers, accelerators and their applications. Originally called the Centre for Advanced Technology, it was renamed by the Indian Prime Minister in December 2005 as Raja Ramanna Centre for Advanced Technology, after noted Indian physicist Raja Ramanna.

== Location ==
The centre is situated at the south-western end of the Indore, Madhya Pradesh. It is about 11 km from the Indore Railway station as well as the Indore airport. The nearest residential locality is Rajendra Nagar. The RRCAT campus is spread over a 760 hectare picturesque site on the outskirts of Indore city. The campus encompasses laboratories, staff housing colony and other basic amenities like school, sports facilities, shopping complex, gardens etc.

== Research activities ==
RRCAT has developed two synchrotron radiation sources called "Indus": Indus-1 is a 450 MeV electron storage ring, whereas Indus-2 is a booster cum storage ring that can accelerate electrons from an injection energy of 550 MeV to 2.5 GeV. RRCAT also provides training to young scientists at BARC Training School located in its campus who later joined several DAE units like BARC Mumbai, IGCAR Kalpakkam, VECC Kolkata and RRCAT as Scientific Officers. It also provides a strong basis of front line research for external Ph.D. scholar in the related fields.

RRCAT has also been actively involved in providing scientific and material assistance to the CERN sponsored Large Hadron Collider. In addition to this, the centre conducts Trainings, Doctoral Programs to take up research and development work in the frontline areas of particle accelerators, lasers, cryogenics, superconductivity, plasma physics and related high technology fields.

=== Propulsion technology ===
With the goal of launching astronauts to the moon by 2040, ISRO has started developing the strategy. Thirty tonnes of payload on rockets are anticipated to be carried on the trip. On September 4, 2024, Liquid Propulsion System Centre (LPSC) and Raja Ramanna Centre for Advanced Technology (RRCAT) signed a Memorandum of Understanding (MoU) for the development of propulsion technology that can lift up to 30 tonnes and be conveniently transported to space and the moon. The duration for technology development has been established at eighteen to twenty-four months.

The launch vehicle's engine will use methane and liquid oxygen for propulsion. For engine development, RRCAT will make use of Laser Additive Manufacturing (LAM). According to Dr. V. Narayanan, the director of LPSC, Next Generation Launch Vehicle Soorya will require a minimum of 25 rocket engines; therefore, the current annual capacity of producing 2-3 engines will be upgraded. The physical construction of the engine will take eight years. The engine will be used to launch cargo into orbit initially. Subsequently, the engine will go through human-rated certification, enabling Indian astronauts to reach the moon.
