= V. Narayanan (engineer) =

11th Chairman of ISRO

- Dr. V. Narayanan at ISRO Headquarters

11th Chairman of ISRO
- Incumbent
- Assumed office 14 January 2025
- Preceded by: S. Somanath

Secretary of the Department of Space
- Incumbent
- Assumed office 14 January 2025
- Preceded by: S. Somanath

Director of the Liquid Propulsion Systems Centre
- In office 23 January 2018 – 14 January 2025
- Preceded by: S. Somanath
- Succeeded by: M. Mohan

Personal details
- Born: 14 May 1964 (age 62) Melakattuvilai, Kanniyakumari District, Madras State (now Tamil Nadu), India
- Education: Government Polytechnic College, Nagercoil (DME); Institution of Engineers (AMIE); IIT Kharagpur (M.Tech.) (PhD)

V. Narayanan (born 14 May 1964) is an Indian cryogenic engineer and rocket scientist who is the Chairman of the Indian Space Research Organisation (ISRO) and the Secretary of the Department of Space (DoS) since 14 January 2025.

He was the Director of the Liquid Propulsion Systems Centre (LPSC) from 23 January 2018 to 14 January 2025, the day when he assumed the chairmanship of ISRO. He is to lead the organisation during the ongoing development of various upcoming programmes, including the Gaganyaan and Chandrayaan-4 missions, as well as the launch of the Bharatiya Antariksh Station in the forthcoming years.

== Early life and education ==
V. Narayanan was born 14 May 1964 in Melakattuvilai, a village near Nagercoil in Kanyakumari District, Tamil Nadu, to C. Vanniya Perumal, a coconut trader and S. Thangammal. He was the eldest child of six siblings. Narayanan would frequently help out at his father's coconut shop in the Vadasery market in Nagercoil. He studied till 5th grade at the government primary school in Keezha Kattuvilai, from 1969 to 1974. Narayanan then studied at the LMS Higher Secondary School in Zionpuram till 10th grade, from 1974 to 1979. His house did not have electricity till he was in 9th grade.

Narayanan completed both his schooling and DME (Diploma in Mechanical Engineering) with First Rank. He completed his DME at the Government Polytechnic College, Nagercoil in 1982. In 1982, after his graduation, he and his brother both earned admission for the Bachelor of Engineering course. Because his family could afford to pay for only one brother's education, Narayanan chose not to pursue the course at Anna University, his dream college. After his DME, he worked at multiple companies like TI Cycles, BHEL and MRF for one and a half years. He later did his AMIE course in Mechanical Engineering.

He earned both a M.Tech. in Cryogenic engineering and a Ph.D. in Aerospace engineering from IIT Kharagpur in 1989 and 2001.

== Career ==
Narayanan joined ISRO in 1984, initially working in the Solid Propulsion area for Rohini Sounding Rockets, Augmented Satellite Launch Vehicles (ASLV), and Polar Satellite Launch Vehicles (PSLV) at the Vikram Sarabhai Space Centre (VSSC) in Thiruvananthapuram. He contributed to the process planning, control, and realisation of ablative nozzle systems, composite motor cases, and composite igniter cases.

=== At LPSC ===
In 1989, after completing his MTech, he transitioned to the Cryogenic Propulsion area at the Liquid Propulsion Systems Centre (LPSC). According to Vasudevan Gnana Gandhi, director of ISRO's propulsion unit at the time, Narayanan had initially joined ISRO's fibreglass unit, and was referred to the propulsion unit by VSSC director S. Ramakrishna. Narayanan was one among the approximately 20 engineers sent by ISRO to Russia in order to train on Russian cryogenic engines and incorporate them in Indian launch vehicles. Narayanan played a crucial role in the development of India's cryogenic propulsion systems, contributing to the successful development and testing of sub-systems such as gas generators, sub-scale cryogenic engines, and thrust chambers. His efforts were instrumental in making India one of the six countries with indigenous cryogenic propulsion technology.

As the Project Director of the C25 Cryogenic Project, Narayanan provided techno-managerial leadership in designing and developing the C25 Cryogenic Propulsion System for the GSLV Mk III Launch Vehicle. Under his guidance, the system was developed in a short time frame and successfully inducted into the GSLV Mk-III vehicle. He also had an important role in the successful maiden launch of the GSLV Mk-III. Narayanan's team built and dispatched the L110 Vikas engine for the Chandrayaan-2 and Chandrayaan-3 missions, which were used by both spacecraft in their landing attempts on the moon.

The engines developed at the LPSC during Narayanan's directorship.

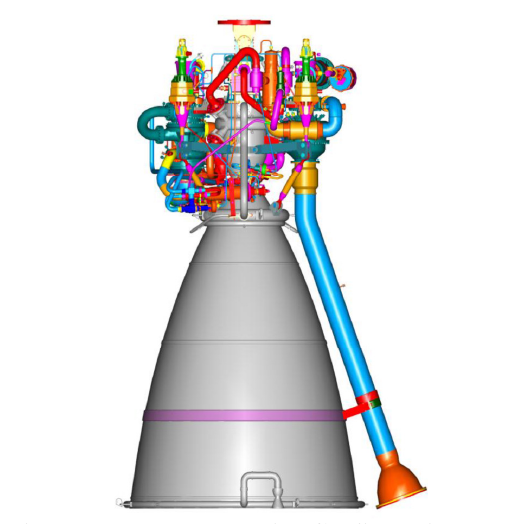
The CE-20 (C25) engine

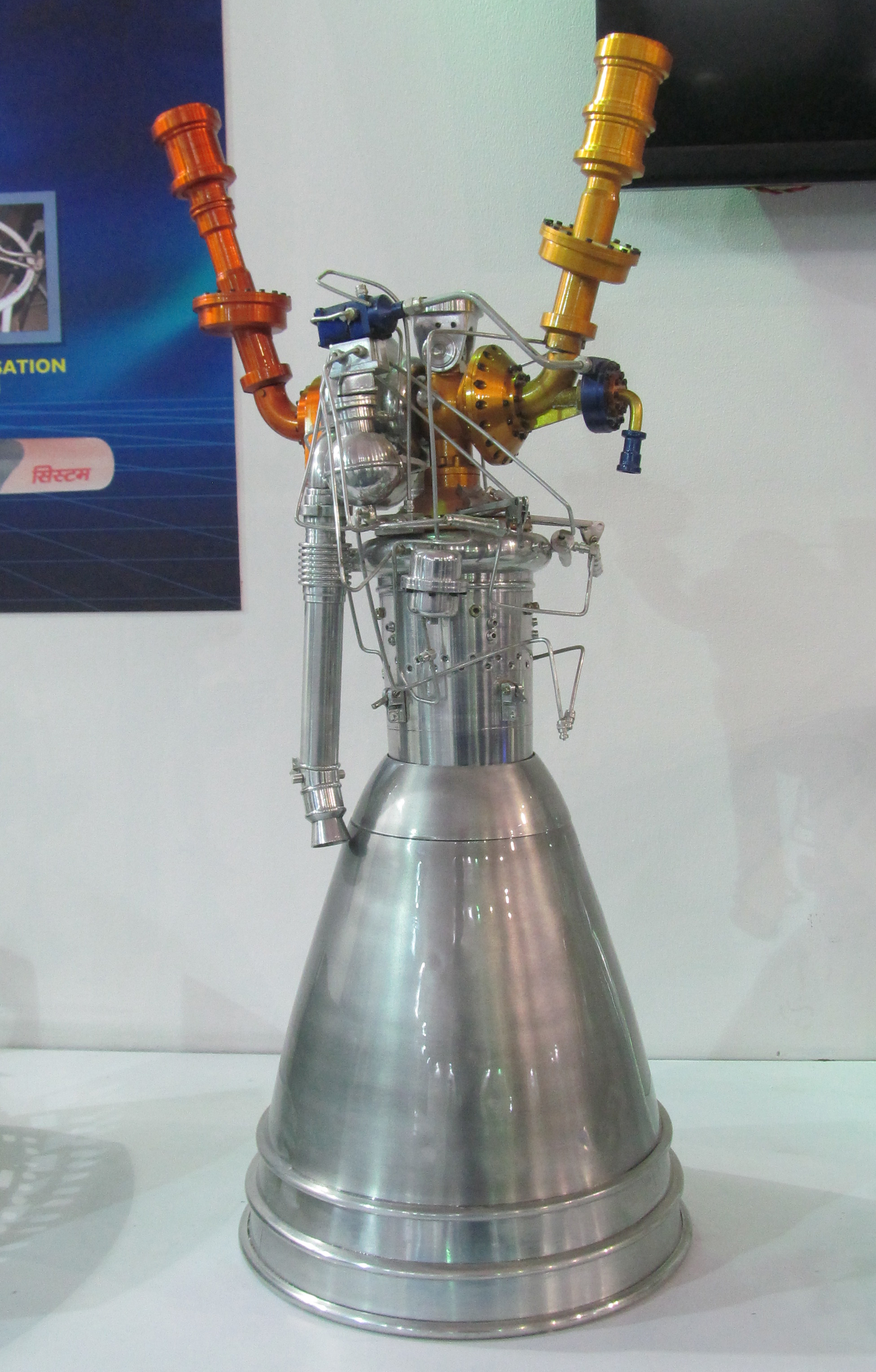
The Vikas engine

Narayanan's team also built the 2nd stage, 4th stage and control power plants of the PSLV-C57 launch vehicle used in the Aditya-L1 solar observation mission, and also built its propulsion systems. For the Gaganyaan mission, his team is working on the crewed flight capable versions of the GSLV Mk-III launch vehicle and the L110 and C32 engines. Narayan was the chairman of the Mission Readiness Review of the Test Vehicle Abort Mission-1 (TVD-1) test. Narayanan set ISRO's Propulsion Road Map for 2017 to 2037, and LPSC, during his directorship, began building the reusable Next Generation Launch Vehicle (NGLV).

In January 2018, he became the Director of the LPSC, overseeing the development of liquid, semi-cryogenic, and cryogenic propulsion stages for launch vehicles, as well as chemical and electric propulsion systems for satellites. During his tenure, the LPSC delivered 183 liquid propulsion systems for 41 launch vehicles and 31 spacecraft missions over seven years. Narayanan is the third consecutive LPSC director to become the ISRO chairman after Somanath and K. Sivan.

=== Chairman of ISRO ===
Experts who spoke to The Indian Express have said the reason Narayanan was appointed as ISRO chairman, instead of VSSC chairman S. Unnikrishnan Nair, was Narayanan's identification of errors made during Chandrayaan-2's landing attempt and fixing these in Chandrayaan-3's lander, which led to a successful landing. Speaking to The Hindu on his appointment, he said the number of satellites India has in orbit has to be increased from 54 to 100 within three to four years, given the country's needs. Narayanan has said the new SSLV Launch Complex located in Kulasekarapattinam will be launch ready within two years, and it will be used to launch SSLV missions.

He has also said he intends to take India's share in the global space sector from 2% to 10%. During his tenure, some missions ISRO has lined up are the IRNSS-1K launch, the SpaDeX space docking and the Gaganyaan-1 (G1) uncrewed test flight; the agency also intends to commence the groundwork for the Bharatiya Antariksh Station, Mangalyaan 2 and its first Venus Orbiter Mission. ISRO also has government approvals for the Chandrayaan-4 and Chandrayaan-5 missions. The agency will launch three uncrewed Gaganyaan flights before launching a crewed mission. Narayanan further said ISRO is developing the NGLV to launch a space station and land on the Moon, as the NGLV is twice the height of a GSLV and carries 30 tons compared to the GSLV's 22.5 tons. A new launchpad is being built at the Satish Dhawan Space Centre in Sriharikota which can accommodate the NGLV rockets. The new launchpad will take 4 years for completion and cost 4,000 crores. The first stage of the NGLV will be reusable, similar to the Falcon launch vehicles developed by SpaceX.

The two satellites of the SpaDex mission docked successfully on 16 January 2025; making India the fourth nation to execute a space docking after the USA, Russia and China.

== Awards and accolades ==
Narayanan has received several accolades, including the Silver Medal from IIT Kharagpur for First Rank in MTech, the Gold Medal from the Astronautical Society of India (ASI), and the ASI Award for Rocket and Related Technologies. He is a Fellow of the Indian National Academy of Engineering, the Institution of Engineers (India), the Indian Cryogenic Council, and the Aeronautical Society of India. A. P. J. Abdul Kalam Award by the government of Tamil Nadu on 15 August 2025. In 2025, during its 39th Convocation Ceremony, the University of Burdwan conferred upon him the D.Sc degree in an honorary capacity.

== Personal life ==
Narayanan is married to Kavitharaj NK, the daughter of a professor. Their daughter is a B.Tech. and PGDM graduate and works at a multinational company, while their son is pursuing his B.Tech. course in computer engineering.

== Selected works ==
- Narayanan, V.; Suresh, M. S.; Jayan, N.; Bijukumar, K. S. (2014). "Mathematical modelling of a cryogenic engine". International Journal of Advances in Engineering Sciences and Applied Mathematics. 6 (3–4): 183–194. doi:10.1007/s12572-015-0117-2.
- RS, Praveen; Jayan, N.; Bijukumar, K. S.; Jayaprakash, J.; Narayanan, N.; Ayyapan, G. (February 2017). Development of Cryogenic Engine for GSLV MkIII: Technological Challenges. 2017 IOP Conference Series: Materials Sciences and Engineering. Vol. 171. pp. 1–7. doi:10.1088/1757-899X/171/1/012059.
- Xavier, M.; Edwin Raj, R.; Narayanan, V. (2017). Thermal stratification in LH2 tank of cryogenic propulsion stage tested in ISRO facility. 26th International Cryogenic Engineering Conference & International Cryogenic Materials Conference 2016 7–11 March 2016, New Delhi, India. IOP Conference Series: Materials Science and Engineering. Vol. 171. pp. 1–8. doi:10.1088/1757-899X/171/1/012063.
- Baiju, A. P.; Jayan, N.; Nageswaran, G.; Suresh, M. S.; Narayanan, V. (2021). "A Technology for Improving Regenerative Cooling in Advanced Cryogenic Rocket Engines for Space Transportation". Advances in Astronautics Science and Technology. Selected Papers from the 71st International Astronautical Congress, IAC 2020. 4 (1): 11–18. Bibcode:2021AAnST...4...11B. doi:10.1007/s42423-020-00071-0.

== Bibliography ==
- Mishra, Akanksha (8 January 2025). "Meet V Narayanan, Rocket Scientist Set to Become 11th ISRO Chairman & Lead Gaganyaan, Chandrayaan-4". ThePrint. Archived from the original on 10 January 2025.
- Rabi, M. Abdul (12 January 2025). "The boy who dreamt of stars to chairman of India's space dreams: V Narayanan's story of perseverance". The New Indian Express. Archived from the original on 15 January 2025.
- Rabi, M. Abdul (9 January 2025). "TN village celebrates meteoric rise of son to ISRO top job". The New Indian Express. Archived from the original on 12 January 2025.
- Sinha, Amitabh; Dutt, Anona (9 January 2025). "'He's like me, rose from poverty to the top': Former ISRO chief K Sivan on new chairman V Narayanan". The Indian Express. Archived from the original on 11 January 2025.
- Tiki, Rajwi (8 January 2025). "V. Narayanan, who is set to take over as ISRO Chairman, terms his new assignment 'a great responsibility'". The Hindu. Archived from the original on 11 January 2025.
- "Can launch our next 100 in 5 years, says ISRO chief V Narayanan". DT Next. 29 January 2025. Archived from the original on 4 February 2025.
