= CE-20 =

Rocket engine developed by ISRO for upper stage of its LVM3 rocket

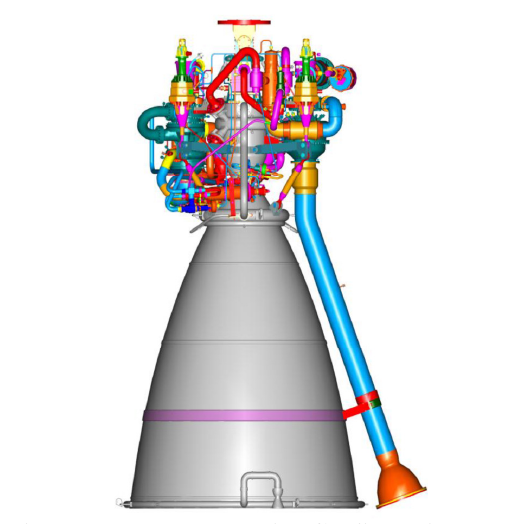
- A computer model of CE-20
- Country of origin: India
- First flight: 5 June 2017
- Designer: LPSC, ISRO
- Manufacturer: Hindustan Aeronautics Limited
- Application: Upper stage booster
- Status: Active

Liquid-fuel engine
- Propellant: LOX / LH2
- Mixture ratio: 5.05
- Cycle: Gas Generator

Configuration
- Chamber: 1
- Nozzle ratio: 100

Performance
- Thrust, vacuum: 186.36 kN (41,900 lbf)
- Throttle range: 180–220 kN (40,000–49,000 lbf)
- Chamber pressure: 6 MPa (870 psi)
- Specific impulse, vacuum: 442 seconds (4.33 km/s)
- Burn time: 640-800 seconds

Dimensions
- Dry mass: 588 kg (1,296 lb)

Used in
- Upper stage of LVM3 & NGLV

The CE-20 is a cryogenic rocket engine developed by the Liquid Propulsion Systems Centre (LPSC), a subsidiary of ISRO. It has been developed to power the upper stage of the LVM3. It is the first Indian cryogenic engine to feature a gas-generator cycle. The high thrust cryogenic engine is the most powerful upper stage cryogenic engine in operational service.

CE20 engine model at 9th Bengaluru Space Expo 2026, BIEC

Among the thrust levels for which CE-20 is qualified are 19 tonnes for ongoing satellite missions, 20 tonnes for the Gaganyaan, and an upgraded 22 tonnes for future launches like the Bharatiya Antariksh Station's BAS-01 Base Module.

== Overview ==
The CE-20 is the first Indian cryogenic engine to feature a gas-generator cycle. The engine produces a nominal thrust of 200 kN, but has an operating thrust range between 180 kN to 220 kN and can be set to any fixed values between these limits. The combustion chamber burns liquid hydrogen and liquid oxygen at 6 MPa with 5.05 engine mixture ratio. The engine has a thrust-to-weight ratio of 34.7 and a specific impulse of 442 seconds (4.33 km/s) in vacuum.

== Development and Testing ==
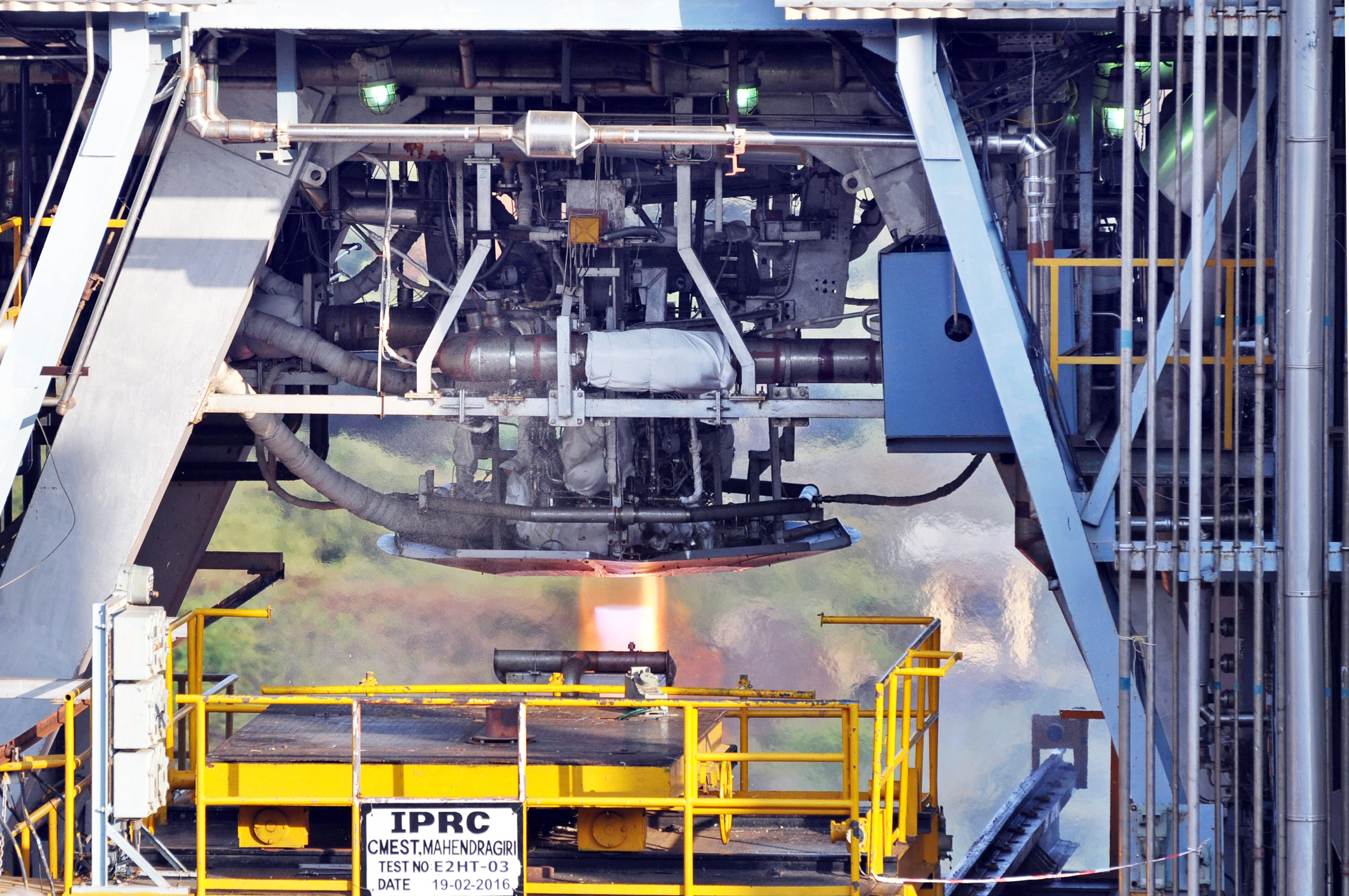
CE-20 during static testing at Cryo Main Engine and Static Test facility (CMEST) of ISRO Propulsion Complex (IPRC), Mahendragiri on 19 February 2016

- On 28 April 2015, CE-20 cleared a 635 seconds long duration hot test at IPRC, Mahendragiri test facility. This test was preceded by two cold start tests and four short duration hot tests.
- On 16 July 2015, the first developmental CE-20 engine 'E1' was successfully endurance hot tested at ISRO Propulsion Complex, Mahendragiri for a duration of 800 seconds with Mixture Ratio Controller (MRC) in closed loop mode. This duration is approximately 25% more than the engine burn duration in flight. This was tenth development test for CE-20.
- On 10 August 2015, a short duration (5.7 seconds) hot test on the CE-20 engine was done to demonstrate the successful engine ignition with tank pressure conditions as in flight.
- On 19 February 2016, the second developmental CE-20 engine 'E2' was hot-tested for a duration of 640 seconds with Mixture Ratio Controller (MRC) in closed loop mode at ISRO Propulsion Complex, Mahendragiri.
- On 03 December 2016, flight acceptance test of 25 seconds in high altitude conditions was carried out on third developmental CE-20 engine (E3). It was successfully flown on the first developmental flight 'D1' of the GSLV Mk-III on 5 June 2017.
- On 25 January 2017, CE-20 engine E2 integrated with development stage for GSLV Mk III, C25 'D' was tested for duration of 50 seconds.
- On 17 February 2017, CE-20 engine E2 integrated with development stage for GSLV Mk III, C25 'D' was tested for duration of 640 seconds.
- On 11 October 2018, CE-20 engine E6 completed 25 second long flight acceptance test in high altitude conditions for GSLV Mk III M1/Chandrayaan-2 mission
- On 16 December 2021, CE-20 (E9 engine) was tested to demonstrate the repeatability of engine ignition with stable combustion. Two ignition trial tests of 3.2 seconds duration were conducted nominally followed by a nominal hot test of 50 seconds duration.
- On 12 January 2022, CE-20 engine E9 completed 720 second long qualification test for Gaganyaan programme.
- On 29 October 2022, CE-20 engine E11 completed flight acceptance hot test for 25 seconds. Test was conducted to check the integrity of hardware, subsystems' performance and tuning the engine for LVM3 M3 mission.
- On 9 November 2022, CE-20 engine E9 was hot tested for 70 seconds. During this test the engine operated at thrust level of approximately 20 tonnes for the first 40 seconds and then switched to an uprated thrust regime of 21.8 tonnes lasting ~30 seconds. This uprated engine would increase payload capacity of LVM3 to GTO by up to 450 kg along an appropriate stage with additional propellant loading. As part of engine modification, Thrust Control Valve (TCV), 3D-printed LOX and LH2 turbine, and exhaust casings were introduced for the first time.
- On 23 December 2022, CE-20 engine E9 was hot tested for 650 second duration. For the first 40 seconds of test, the engine was operated at 20.2 tonne thrust level, after this engine was operated at 20 tonne off-nominal zones and then for 435 seconds it was operated at 22.2 tonne thrust level. With this test, the 'E9' engine has been qualified for induction in flight. The E9 engine with this hot test has undergone twelve hot tests with 3370 seconds cumulative burn duration at different thrust & mixture ratio levels.
- On 24 February 2023, CE-20 engine went through flight acceptance testing for LVM3-M4/Chandrayaan-3 successfully. The test was done at High Altitude Test Facility and lasted for of nominal 25 seconds duration.
- On 2 November 2025, the thrust chamber on CE-20 engine of C25 stage on LVM3-M5 flight was reignited 100 seconds after the injection of CMS-03 (aka GSAT-7R).
- On 7 November 2025, a boot-strap mode start test on the CE20 engine was conducted under vacuum conditions in the High-Altitude Test (HAT) facility at IPRC, Mahendragiri for 10 second duration. Using a multi-element igniter first the thrust chamber and then the gas generator were ignited under tank head conditions, and the turbopumps were started without the use of the start-up system. Boot-strap mode build-up and steady-state operation of the engine were successfully demonstrated.

=== CE20 Hot Tests for the Gaganyaan and 22t Thrust Qualification ===
- On 9 August 2023, CE-20 engine E13 successfully operated with uprated thrust level of 22t for a nominal duration of 50 seconds. This hot test (HT-01) was aimed at engine tuning.
- On 30 August 2023, CE-20 engine E13 conducted second hot test (HT-02) to demonstrate the engine's reliability and stability for a long duration of 720 seconds with a thrust level of 19.7t.
- On 22 September 2023, CE-20 engine E13 successfully conducted for a long duration of 670 seconds with an uprated thrust level of 22t. With this third hot test (HT-03), qualification activities of the CE-20 engine for the Gaganyaan program were successfully completed.
- On 9 October 2023, CE-20 engine E13 underwent fourth hot test (HT-04), to demonstrate engine operation in off-nominal conditions. It was conducted nominally for a duration of 125 seconds. With this test, the CE-20 engine was qualified for operation at 22t thrust level during flight.
- On 19 October 2023, flight acceptance testing of CE-20 engine E12 was successfully completed for a duration of 25 seconds. This engine is assigned for the first uncrewed Gaganyaan mission HLVM3-GX.
- On 8 November 2023, CE-20 engine E13 underwent fifth hot test (HT-05) for evaluating the off-nominal operation of the engine. Test was successfully conducted for the duration of 140 second at MET facility, IPRC, Mahendragiri and qualified the CE20 engine for operating at 22t thrust level during flight.
- On 5 January 2024, CE-20 engine E13 underwent sixth hot test (HT-06). This vacuum ignition test was conducted for a duration of 2.5 seconds in High Altitude Test condition at Thrust chamber test facility of IPRC.
- On 13 February 2024, CE-20 engine identified for the first uncrewed Gaganyaan-1 mission passed flight acceptance after a series of ground qualification tests. With this, human rating of CE-20 cryogenic engine for the Gaganyaan Programme was completed.

=== Upgraded Thrust Qualification ===
- On 29 November 2024, ISRO carried out a sea-level hot test for the CE-20, which has a nozzle protection system and a high-area nozzle ratio of 100. A multi-element igniter's capacity for engine restart was proven. While keeping an eye on the health condition of the other two parts, ISRO activated the first element of a multi-element igniter. All necessary performance requirements were met.
- On 7 February 2025, using a multi-element igniter under vacuum, ISRO successfully tested the ignition of CE-20 at High Altitude Test Facility. The test results matched the tank pressure parameters needed for engine restart during actual space flight. The use of bootstrap mode for turbopump startup rather than conventional stored gas systems is one of the new restart strategies being investigated by ISRO. This test was part of the larger effort to allow multiple restart of cryogenic engine while in orbit. The engine performed well.This was the first time a Gas Generator cycle engine was tested in bootstrap mode in the world.
- On 10 March 2026, a sea-level hot test was successfully carried out for CE-20 engine E13 at 22t thrust level using a multi-element igniter, and nozzle protection system for 165 seconds at CMEST. This was the twentieth test that demonstrated ignition margin for Gaganyaan over a broad range of propellant tank pressure and pre-ignition chamber pressure, engine qualification for Gaganyaan at 20t thrust level, boot-strap mode start-up to enable engine re-start during flight, qualification of indigenous turbopump bearings, indigenous sensors, and nozzle protection system. Future LVM3 missions are intended to use this engine in an uprated C32 stage to increase the payload capacity.
- On 6 July 2026, flight acceptance hot test of CE20 engine E18 with divergent area ratio of 1:100 for LVM3-M7 mission was conducted with a thrust level of 19.5 t for 45 seconds duration and 22 t for a duration of 25 seconds. This test also validated Human-rating qualification requirements for Gaganyaan missions. Engine E18 will be refurbished and integrated with C32 stage for LVM3-M7 mission.
- On 9 September 2026, flight acceptance hot test of CE20 engine for C32 stage to used for LVM3-M7 mission was conducted at thrust level of 22t.

== Manufacturing ==
The CE-20 cryogenic engine is manufactured by Hindustan Aeronautics Limited at its Integrated Cryogenic Engine Manufacturing Facility (ICEMF) in New Tippasandra, a suburb of Bengaluru. In 2019 and 2020, a CE-20 Engine was modified into using Methalox propellants as development perquisite of the LME-1100. This engine was called the LM20-TD engine. modifications were carried out in the propellant flow control system and the engine start-up systems. The LM-20-TD also operated on the gas generator cycle with major subsystems derived from the CE-20. One cold flow test and five hot tests were carried out successfully at IPRC.

== See also ==
- CE-7.5
- LVM3
- LME-1100
