= Institution of Engineers (India) =

National organization of engineers in India

The Institution of Engineers (India)
- Abbreviation: IEI
- Formation: 13 September 1920; 105 years ago
- Headquarters: 8 Gokhale Road, Kolkata, West Bengal, India
- President: Er. Manish Mahendra Kothari, FIE, CEng
- Website: ieindia.org

The Institution of Engineers (India), the IEI, is a national organization for engineers in India. It is the world's largest multi-disciplinary engineering professional society. It has more than one million members in 15 engineering disciplines. The institution was established in 1920 in Kolkata, West Bengal, and was incorporated by royal charter in 1935. It is currently headquartered at 8 Gokhale Road, Kolkata.

== Qualifications and recognitions ==
The IEI pioneered non-formal education in engineering. For those who have pursued a formal education in engineering, an associate membership engineering degree certificate can be achieved by qualifying in the examinations conducted by the institution.

The Associate Member (AMIE) examination has two sections. Section A is common to all candidates, while Section B is specific to a particular stream of engineering. To take the examinations, the candidate must have been a technician member of the IEI for a year. Examinations are held twice yearly.

Post-graduate (masters) programs in engineering and technology are offered to IEI corporate members in selected engineering disciplines.

=== International recognitions ===
The Institution of Engineers (India) [IEI] has bilateral relations with engineering professional institutions in 41 organizations around the world and is also the founding member of major international engineering organizations. This mutual relationship promotes the advancement of the engineering profession in general and recognition in particular amongst all the members attached to these professional societies. IEI plays the leading role in engineering activities across the world and provides an international platform to its members.

The Foreign Credential Service of America considers it to be equivalent to a bachelor's degree in engineering. AMIE is also recognized by UK-NARIC as a British bachelor's honors degree.

== Notable alumni ==
- Ashwani Lohani
- Dr. V. Narayanan

== Honorary Life Fellows ==
The Institution of Engineers (India) has recognised the following individuals as Honorary Life Fellows:

- Prof C. N. R. Rao (HLF-34)
- Padma Vibhushan G. Madhavan Nair (HLF-38)
- Padma Vibhushan Dr E. Sreedharan (HLF-39)
- Dr K. Radhakrishnan (HLF-40)
- Lt Gen (Dr) V. J. Sundaram, PVSM, AVSM, VSM (Retd) (HLF-41)
- Dr B. D. Mundhra (HLF-42)
- Mr Nitish Kumar (HLF-43)
- Padmashree Dr H. C. Visvesvaraya (HLF-44)
- Dr S. Somanath (HLF-45)
- Mr Bhupendra Rajnikant Patel (HLF-46)
- Dr V. Narayanan (HLF-47)
- Mr Nitin Jairam Gadkari (HLF-48)

== See also ==
- Engineering education in India
- Engineering Staff College of India
- Regulation and licensure in engineering
