= Human-rating certification =

Certification of a spacecraft or launch vehicle

Human-rating certification, also known as man-rating or crew-rating, is the certification of a spacecraft or launch vehicle as capable of safely transporting humans. There is no one particular standard for human-rating a spacecraft or launch vehicle, and the various entities that launch or plan to launch such spacecraft specify requirements for their particular systems to be human-rated.

== NASA ==
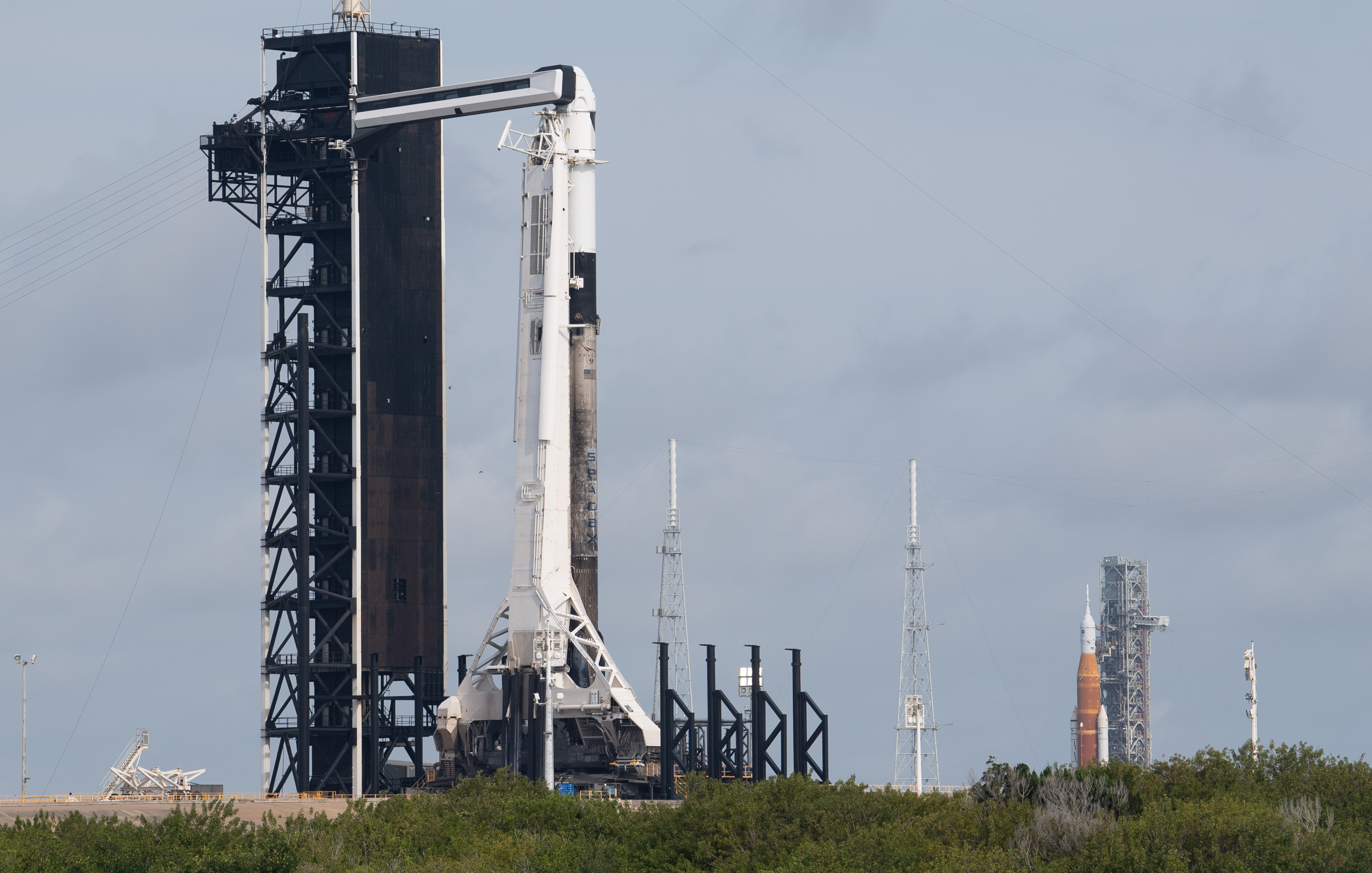
SpaceX's Falcon 9 with Dragon 2 for Axiom Mission 1 and NASA's Space Launch System with Orion for Artemis I. They are America's two main vehicles for manned spaceflights at the moment.

One entity that applies human rating is the US government civilian space agency, NASA. NASA's human-rating requires not just that a system be designed to be tolerant of failure and to protect the crew even if an unrecoverable failure occurs, but also that astronauts aboard a human-rated spacecraft have some control over it. This set of technical requirements and the associated certification process for crewed space systems are in addition to the standards and requirements for all of NASA's space flight programs.

The development of the Space Shuttle and the International Space Station pre-dated later NASA human-rating requirements. After the Challenger and Columbia accidents, the criteria used by NASA for human-rating spacecraft were made more stringent.

=== Commercial Crew Program (CCP) ===
The NASA CCP human-rating standards require that the probability of a loss on ascent does not exceed 1 in 500, and that the probability of a loss on descent did not exceed 1 in 500. The overall mission loss risk, which includes vehicle risk from micrometeorites and orbital debris while in orbit for up to 210 days, is required to be no more than 1 in 270. Maximum sustained acceleration is limited to 3 g.

The United Launch Alliance (ULA) published a paper submitted to AIAA detailing the modifications to its Delta IV and Atlas V launch vehicles that would be needed to conform to NASA Standard 8705.2B. ULA has since been awarded $6.7 million under NASA's Commercial Crew Development (CCDev) program for development of an Emergency Detection System, one of the final pieces that would be needed to make these launchers suitable for human spaceflight.

SpaceX is using Dragon 2, launched on a Falcon 9 Block 5 rocket, to deliver crew to the ISS. Dragon 2 made its first uncrewed test flight in March 2019 and has been conducting crewed flights since Demo-2 in May 2020.

Boeing's Starliner spacecraft is also part of the Commercial Crew Program since Boeing CFT in June 2024.

== CMSA ==
The China Manned Space Agency (CMSA) operates and oversees crewed spaceflight activities launched from China, including the Shenzhou spacecraft and Tiangong space station.

== Roscosmos ==
Roscosmos, a Russian state corporation, conducts and oversees human spaceflights launched from Russia. This includes Soyuz spacecraft and the Russian Orbital Segment of the International Space Station.

== ISRO ==
The space agency of India, ISRO, oversees planned human spaceflights launched from India.

On 13 February 2024 the CE-20 engine, after a series of ground qualification tests, was certified for crewed Gaganyaan spaceflight missions. The CE-20 will power the upper stage of the human-rated version of the LVM3 (formerly known as GSLV Mk III) launch vehicle.

== Private spaceflight companies ==
Each private spaceflight system builder typically sets up their own specific criteria to be met before carrying humans on a space transport system.

== See also ==
- FAA
- List of human spaceflight programs
