= ISRO Propulsion Complex =

Wholly owned subsidiary of ISRO

Agency overview
- Jurisdiction: Department of Space
- Headquarters: Mahendragiri, Tirunelveli district; 8°16′57″N 77°33′57″E
- Employees: 674 (as of 1 March 2026)
- Annual budget: See the budget of ISRO
- Agency executive: J. Asir Packiaraj, Director
- Parent agency: ISRO
- Website: www.iprc.gov.in

The ISRO Propulsion Complex (IPRC), located at Mahendragiri in Tamil Nadu, is an ISRO centre involved in testing, assembling, and integrating propulsion systems and stages that are developed at ISRO's Liquid Propulsion Systems Centres (LPSC). Formerly, IPRC was known as LPSC, Mahendragiri, functioning under LPSC. It was elevated as an independent centre and renamed as IPRC with effect from 1 February 2014.

The complex is situated near Kavalkinaru junction, Panagudi in Tirunelveli District, Tamil Nadu.

It is one of the ISRO centres that could be called as the "Jet Propulsion Laboratory of India" as all liquid, cryogenic and semicryogenic stage and engine related tests of ISRO's launch vehicles and satellites are carried out here.

== Capabilities ==
Following activities are currently carried out at IPRC:

- Assembly, integration and testing of launch vehicle motors and stages
- Servicing of launch vehicle motors and stages
- Propellant storage
- Sea level and high altitude tests of Vikas, PS2/GS2, PS4, L40, L110, S200, CE-7.5 and CE-20 cryogenic engines, and steering engines
- L40 and CE-7.5 development and qualification tests
- Assembly and integration of flight stages PS2/GS2, PS4, L40 for PSLV and GSLV missions
- Assembly and integration of LAM engine and AOCS thruster for satellites

== Facilities ==
=== Principal Test Stand (PTS) ===
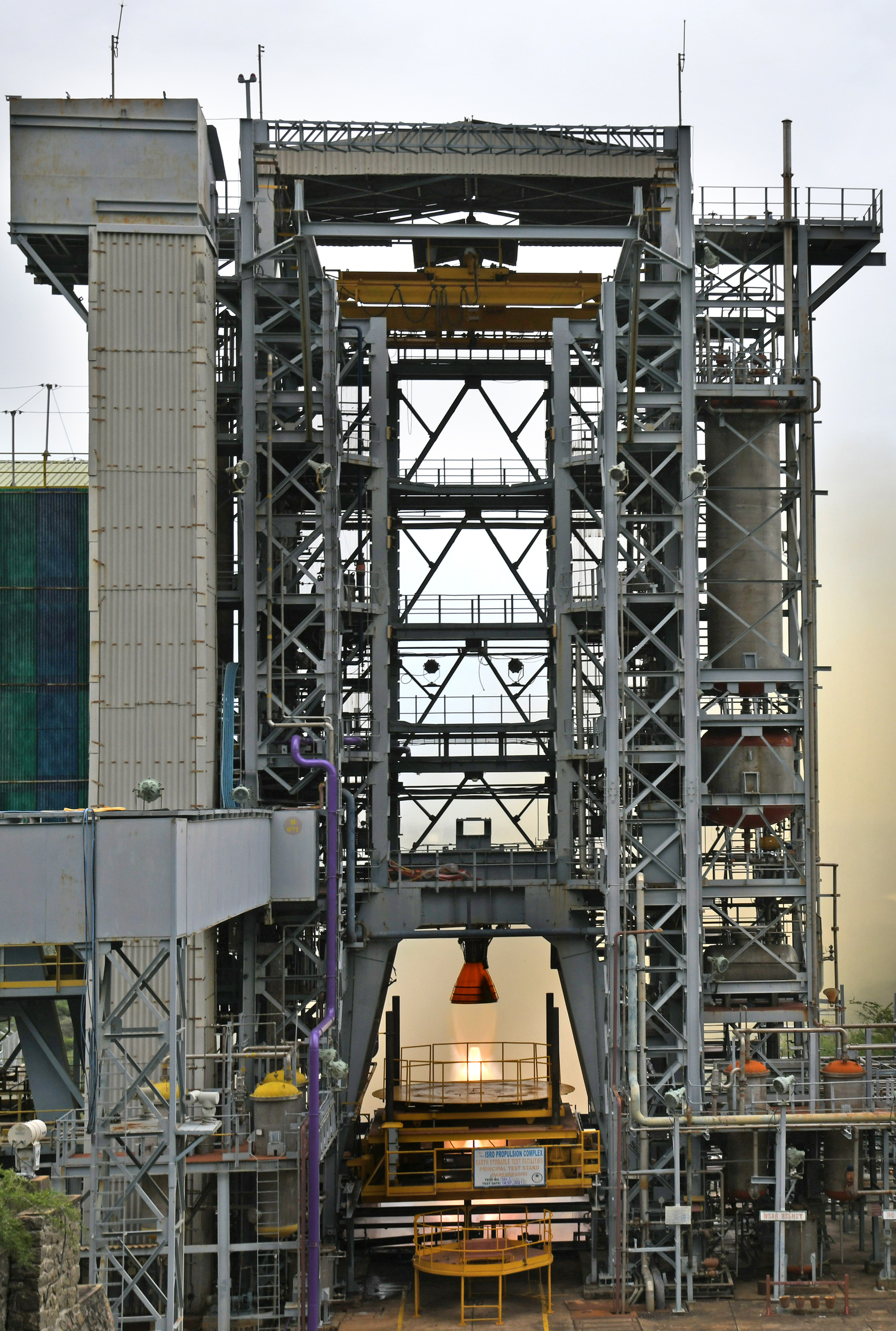
The final long-duration hot fire test of the human-rated L110-G Vikas Engine on PST Mahendragiri

The Principle Test Stand is the oldest facility at IPRC Mahendragiri and was designed to test the Vikas Engine and other hypergolic engines. It consists of two sections, one for engine testing and the other for full stage integrated tests, ensuring accurate evaluation of various performance characteristics and seamless integration of critical components.

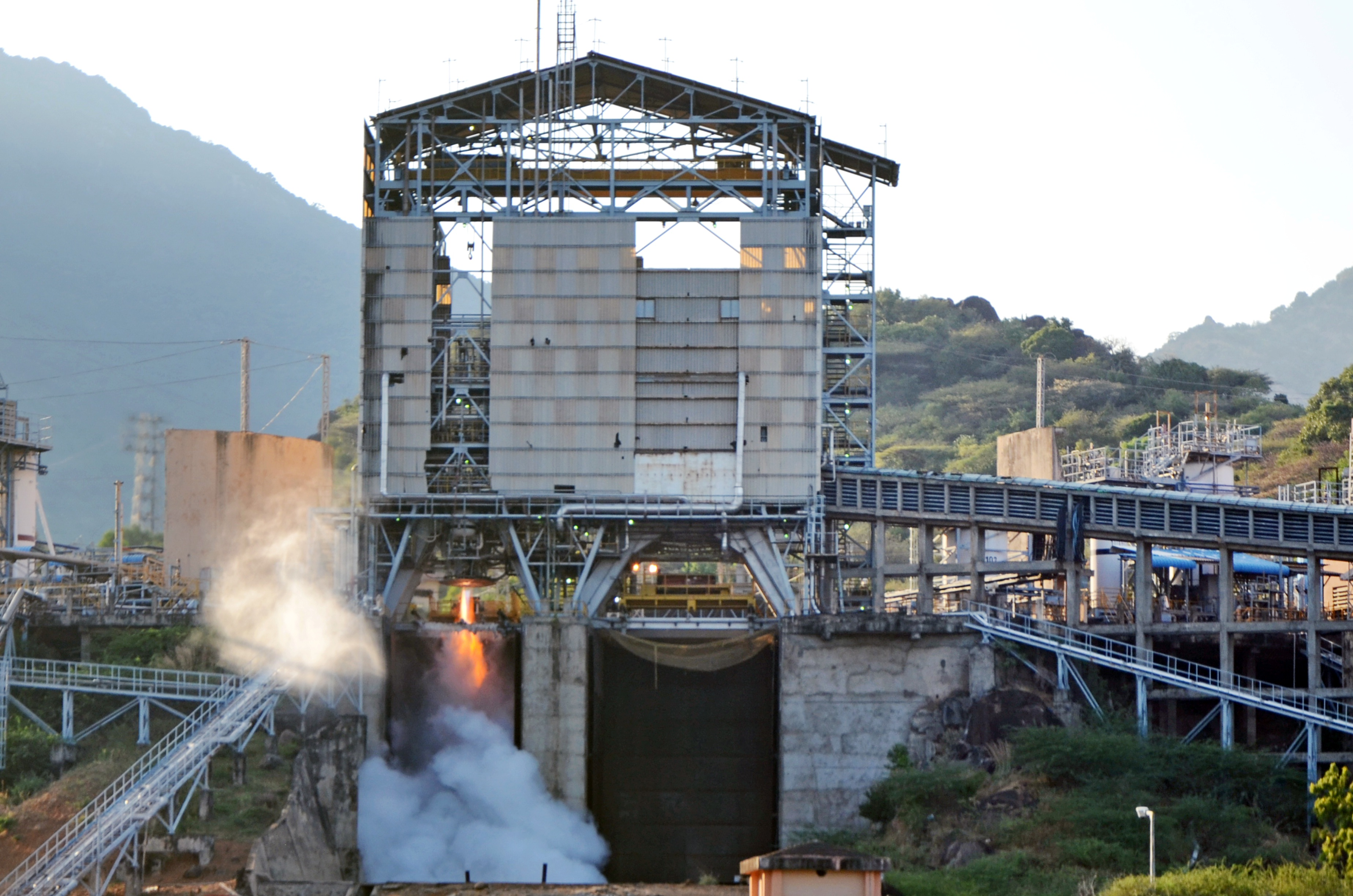
CE-20 Engine undergoing its second flight qualification test on the CMEST Test Stand

=== Cryo Main Engine Static Test Facility (CMEST) ===
The CMEST was set up for testing ISRO's cryogenic engines, specifically the CE-7.5 and CE-20.

=== Semi-cryogenic Integrated Engine Test Facility (SIET) ===
The Semi-cryogenic Integrated Engine Test Complex (SIET) is a facility handling large flow of propellants. It is 51 metres tall and has 30 metres flame deflector depth. It was originally designed for testing the SCE-200 Semi-Cryogenic kerolox engine. This engine is a crucial component of the LVM3 launch vehicle future upgrade, replacing the pair of Vikas engines on its first stage. The SIET was constructed with the aim of conducting tests on the SCE-200 engine, and it was completed by the end of 2022. As part of three space infrastructure projects totaling ₹1,800 crore, Prime Minister Narendra Modi formally inaugurated SIET from the Vikram Sarabhai Space Centre (VSSC) on 27 February 2024. Tests of locally produced engines and its essential subsystems, such as gas generators and turbo pumps, will be conducted at the new testing facility.

The facility consists of a visitors center, which is connected to the Test Control Center (TCC), allowing visitors to observe and learn about the testing procedures. The TCC is a critical element of the complex as it enables engineers and technicians to monitor the tests and make real-time adjustments to ensure their success. This facility has in-house control and data collecting systems and is capable of testing engines with thrusts up to 2,600 kN.

In July 2023, a significant milestone was achieved when the SCE-200 hot section was successfully tested on the stand. This marked a significant achievement in the development of the engine and the progress towards its integration into various launch vehicles. On 2 May 2024, ISRO conducted the first ignition trial for SCE-200 at SIET.

=== High Altitude Test Facility (HATF) ===
The High Altitude Test Facility is used for hot testing cryogenic engines, including in vacuum conditions.

== Incidents ==
In 2017, three employees, including two senior officials of ISRO Propulsion Complex, Mahendragiri were suspended pending enquiry for alleged procedural lapses.

In September 2017, an unexplained explosion took place in the vicinity of the ISRO Propulsion Complex and local said they saw smoke emanating from the ISRO facility. However, a spokesperson said the "incident happened outside the building and has nothing to do with ISRO."

In mid-2023, it was reported that the propulsion complex had terminated the first hot test on an intermediate configuration of the semi-cryogenic engine following an unanticipated spike in the turbine pressure and subsequent loss of turbine speed. The July 1 test that had to be terminated was said to be part of efforts to develop a 2,000 Kilonewton thrust semi-cryogenic engine.

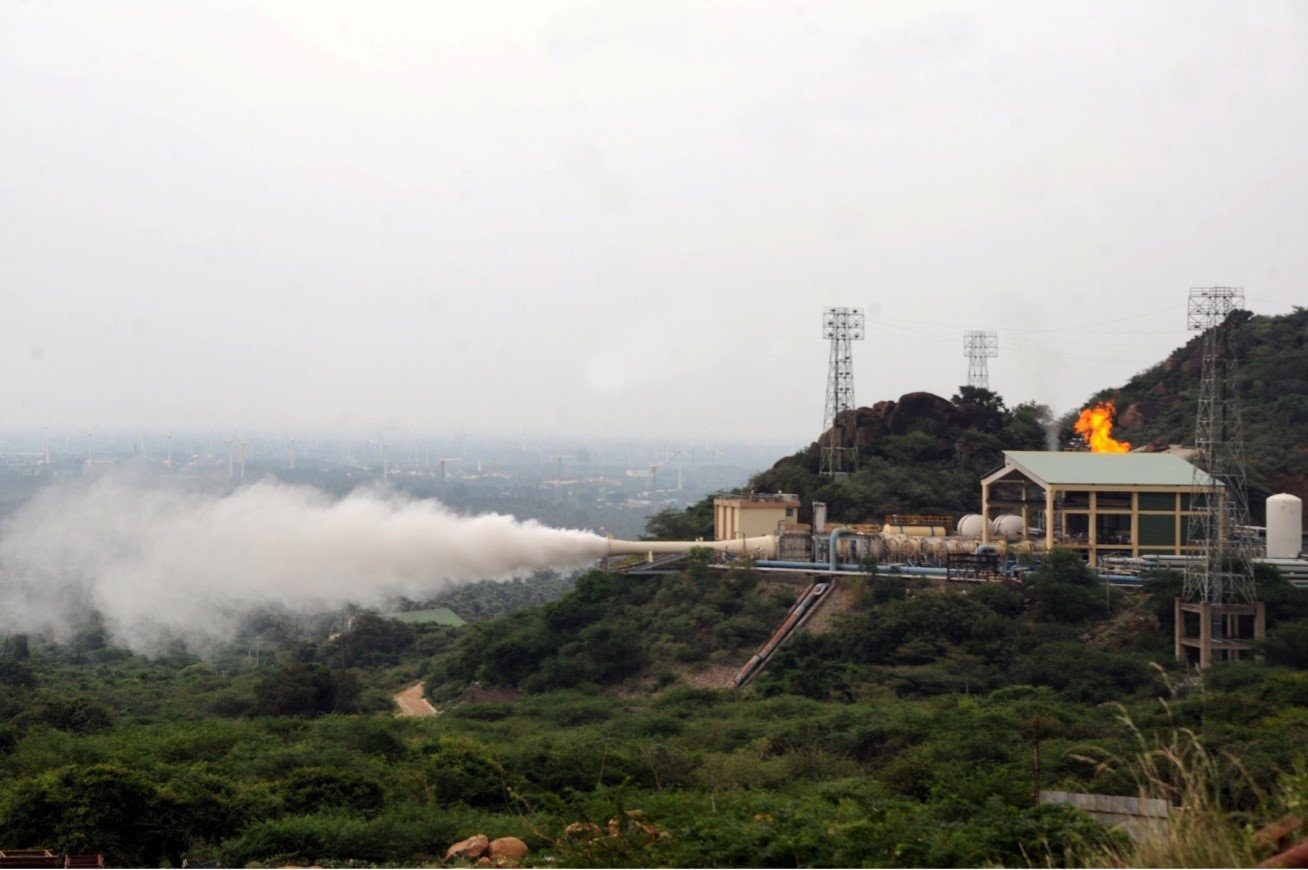
CE-20 Engine undergoing flight acceptance test at HATF Mahendragiri

== See also ==
- Liquid Propulsion Systems Centre
- Vikram Sarabhai Space Centre
- Satish Dhawan Space Centre
- Kulasekarapattinam Spaceport
- Indian Institute of Space Science and Technology
