= Cryogenic engineering =

Cryogenic engineering, also known as cryoengineering, is a sub stream of mechanical engineering dealing with cryogenics, and related very low temperature processes such as air liquefaction, cryogenic engines (for rocket propulsion), cryosurgery. Generally, temperatures below cold come under the purview of cryogenic engineering.

Cryogenics may be considered as the recent advancement in the field of refrigeration. Though there is no fixed demarcation as to where refrigeration ends and cryogenics begins, for general reference, temperatures below –150c(120k) are considered as cryogenic temperature. The four gases which mainly contribute for cryogenic application and research are (O2-B.P.90K), (N2-B.P.77K), (Helium-B.P.4.2k) & (H2-B.P.20K).

The word "cryogenic" is derived from Greek κρύο (cryo) - "icy cold" + γονική (genic) – "having to do with production".
