= Jeevanbimanagar =

Jeevanabimanagara Jeevanabimanagar
- neighbourhood
- Location in Bengaluru, India
- Coordinates: 12.966008°N 77.657672°E
- Country: India
- State: Karnataka
- District: Bangalore Urban
- Metro: Bengaluru

Languages
  - Official: Kannada
- Time zone: UTC+5:30 (IST)
- PIN: 560075

Jeevanabimanagara, also known incorrectly as Jeevan Bhima Nagar is a residential area of east Bangalore. The area extends from the Indiranagara 80 Feet Road in the west to Suranjandas Road in the east. Sublocalties like New Thippasandra, HAL 3rd Stage, Geethanjali Layout, Annayappa Garden, Anandapura, Shivalingaiah Colony, Kullappa Colony, Sudhama Nagara, BDA Layout and Nanja Reddy Colony are also considered a part of Jeevanabimanagara.

Originally, the area was developed for the employees of LIC and KPWD. Therefore, the area predominantly consists of LIC quarters (types L, M, N, P) and KPWD quarters (types A, B, C & D). However, in recent times, due to its proximity to the IT Corridor and the fact that it is a cheaper alternative to Indiranagar, the main hub of East Bangalore, many non-Kannadigas have settled here.

It is well connected by BMTC buses from major bus stations of Bangalore.

Jeevanbimanagara was a purely residential area, but recently many shops and IT companies have come up on the 10th Main Road. ISRO and NAL also have their offices here. The 1st Main Road (BEML Main Road) is a major shopping centre in the area. Kendriya Vidyalaya NAL is located closely near to its bus stop.
