= S. Somanath =

Indian aerospace engineer

Dr. S. Somanath
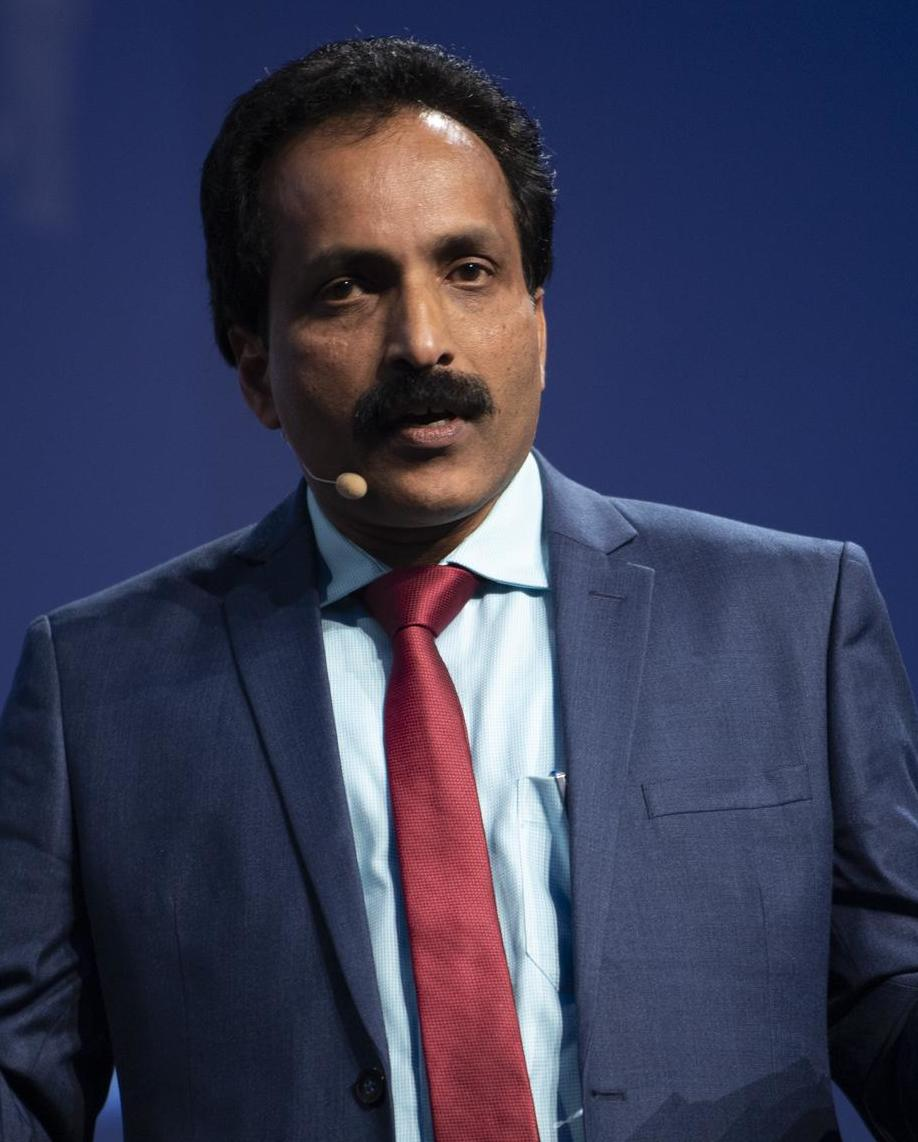
- Somanath in 2019

10th Chairman of ISRO
- In office 15 January 2022 – 14 January 2025
- Preceded by: K. Sivan
- Succeeded by: V. Narayanan

Director of Vikram Sarabhai Space Centre
- In office 24 January 2018 – 14 January 2022
- Preceded by: K. Sivan
- Succeeded by: S. Unnikrishnan Nair

Director of Liquid Propulsion Systems Centre
- In office 1 January 2015 – 23 January 2018
- Preceded by: K. Sivan
- Succeeded by: V. Narayanan

Personal details
- Born: July 1963 (age 63) Thuravoor, Cherthala, Kerala, India
- Spouse: Valsalakumari
- Children: 2
- Education: Thangal Kunju Musaliar College of Engineering (B.Tech., Mechanical Engineering); Indian Institute of Science, Bengaluru (M.Tech. in Aerospace Engineering); Indian Institute of Technology, Madras (PhD)

Sreedhara Panicker Somanath (born July 1963) is an Indian aerospace engineer who served as the chairman of ISRO. Under his chairpersonship, ISRO carried out the third Indian lunar exploration mission named Chandrayaan-3. The lander named Vikram and the rover named Pragyan landed near the lunar south pole region on 23 August 2023 at 18:04 IST, making India the first country to successfully land a spacecraft near the lunar south pole and the fourth country to demonstrate soft landing on the Moon.

Somanath served as the director of Vikram Sarabhai Space Centre (VSSC), Thiruvananthapuram and director of Liquid Propulsion Systems Centre (LPSC), Thiruvananthapuram. Somanath is known for his contributions to launch vehicle design, particularly in the areas of launch vehicle systems engineering, structural design, structural dynamics, and Pyrotechnics.

After concluding his tenure at ISRO, Somanath assumed the role of chancellor at Chanakya University, a liberal arts institution based in Bengaluru.

== Early life and education ==
Somanath was born in a Malayali Nair family as a child of V. Sreedhara Panicker, a Hindi teacher, and Thankamma at Thuravoor in Alappuzha district of Kerala.

Somanath studied at St. Augustine's High School, Aroor, and completed the Pre-Degree course from Maharaja's College, Ernakulam. He then received his graduate degree in mechanical engineering from Thangal Kunju Musaliar College of Engineering, Kollam, and a master's degree in aerospace engineering from Indian Institute of Science, Bangalore, with a specialization in dynamics and control. He was awarded a Ph.D. from the Indian Institute of Technology Madras (IIT Madras).

Somanath is married to Valsala, with whom he has a daughter and a son.

== Career ==
After his graduation, Somanath joined the Vikram Sarabhai Space Centre in 1985. He was associated with the Polar Satellite Launch Vehicle project during its initial phase. He became associate director of the Vikram Sarabhai Space Centre and the project director of the Geosynchronous Satellite Launch Vehicle Mark III launch vehicle in 2010. He was also the deputy director of the Propulsion and Space Ordnance Entity till November 2014.

In June 2015, he took over as director of the Liquid Propulsion Systems Centre at Valiamala, Thiruvananthapuram and served until January 2018. Somanath took over as director of the Vikram Sarabhai Space Centre from K. Sivan who became chairman of Indian Space Research Organisation. In January 2022, he took over as the chairman of the Indian Space Research Organisation, again succeeding K. Sivan.

Somanath completed his 3-year tenure as ISRO's Chairman on 14 January 2025 and this period is known as one of the best in the history of ISRO. On 23 August 2023, he as ISRO chairman spearheaded the soft landing of Chandrayaan-3 on the South Pole of the lunar surface along with other notable senior ISRO scientists. The successful Chandrayaan-3 mission, Aditya-L1 launch and impact developments on the Gaganyaan front gave the public a positive view of him, with the India Today declaring that he "[left] behind a legacy with unparalleled achievements."

He was succeeded by V. Narayanan. Somanath is currently serving as the chancellor of Chanakya University.

In 2025, he was also appointed as the Space Tech Advisor to the Government of Andhra Pradesh

== Controversies ==
In November 2023, S. Somanath’s Malayalam memoir Nilavu Kudicha Simhangal (“The lions that guzzled the moonlight”) drew media attention after excerpts from the book reportedly contained remarks about his predecessor, former ISRO Chairman K. Sivan, and events surrounding the Chandrayaan-2 mission. Following the controversy, Somanath announced that he was withdrawing the book from publication, clarifying that it was not intended to criticise any individual or organisation.

Earlier in August 2023, Somanath’s public comments distinguishing science and belief, made during discussions about naming the Chandrayaan-3 landing site “Shiv Shakti Point,” also received mixed reactions on social media and in sections of the press. In September 2024, the Breakthrough Science society (BSS), a voluntary organisation promoting scientific temper and rational thinking, raised objections to ISRO Chairman Somanath'sremarks praising the role of Sanskrit in India’s emergence as a knowledge society since Vedic times. The organisation stated that such claims promote a “mythological view of history” and blur the distinction between scientific reasoning and cultural belief. The statement by BSS called for separating scientific achievements from religious or linguistic traditions to preserve the objectivity of science.

In July 2024, The New Indian Express reported that a group of senior ISRO scientists had raised complaints about alleged unfairness in promotions and extensions of service within the organisation. The report cited claims of “discrimination” and “caste and regional considerations” influencing key administrative decisions, including the granting of two-year extensions to a few directors while others received only one-year terms. Some scientists alleged that certain appointments and promotions favoured individuals said to be close to him. The news paper also reported that one person, a “close friend” of Somanath, was promoted unfairly.

== Honorary Doctorates ==
- Satyabhama University, 2018
- Centurion University, 2020
- Karunya Institute of Technology and Science, 2022
- SRM University, 2022
- Hindustan Institute of Technology and Science, 2022
- ICFAI Foundation for Higher Education, 2023
- Uttarakhand Technical University, 2023
- Bangalore University, 2023
- Jawaharlal Nehru Technological University, 2024
- Sarada Birla University, 2024
- Amity University, 2024
- DY Patil University, 2024
- Kerala University of Health Sciences, 2024
- Visveswaraya Technological University, 2024
- UAS University, 2024
- Kurukshethra University, 2025
- NIT, Raipur 2025

== International Honors ==
- Full member of International Academy of Astronautics (IAA)
- Member of the Space Transportation Committee of International Astronautical Federation (IAF)
- Member of International Project and Program Management Committee of IAF
- Elected Vice President of IAF (2019-2021) and was Advisor to President, IAF

== Awards ==
- Sabitha Choudhuri Gold Medal from Indian Institute of Science, Bangalore (1994)
- Space Gold Medal by Astronautical Society of India (2003)
- ISRO Merit Award for Individual Achievement (2009)
- ISRO Team Award for the GSLV Mk-III Development (2011)
- ISRO Performance Excellence Award (2013)
- ISRO Team Excellence Award for LVM3-X/CARE mission (2014)
- Platinum Jubilee award from Department of Aerospace Engineering, IISc, Bangalore (2017)
- Lifetime achievement award from TKM College of Engineering, Kollam (2017)
- APJ Abdul Kalam award by Nurul Islam University (2018)
- National Aeronautics Prize, Aeronautical society of India (2018)
- ISRO Outstanding Achievement Award (2019)
- AIMA Managing India Awards (2022)
- Bhaskara Award by Indian Society of Remote Sensing (2022)
- Chattambi Swami Jayanthi Award at Trivandrum (2023)
- Life Fellow Award by IIT Kharagpur (2023)
- Kerala Management Association Leadership Award (2023)
- Distinguished Alumni award from IISc Bangalore (2023)
- Karnataka Rajyotsava Award (2023)
- World Space Award (2023)
- International Astronautical Federation Hall of Fame (2024)
- Karikkakathamma Award (2024)
- Attukaal Amma Award (2024)
- Kerala Sasthra Puraskaaram (2025)
- Malliyoor Puraskaram (2025)
- Special Jury award at EY Entrepreneur of the Year Awards (India) 2024

Government offices
Preceded by K. Sivan	Chairman of the Indian Space Research Organisation; 2022-present	Incumbent
Preceded by K. Sivan	Director, Vikram Sarabhai Space Centre; 2018-2022	Succeeded by S. Unnikrishnan Nair
