= Mahendragiri (Tamil Nadu) =

Hill in Tamil Nadu, India

Mahendragiri மகேந்திரகிரி
- Location within Tamil Nadu

Highest point
- Elevation: 1,654 m (5,427 ft)
- Coordinates: 8°23′18″N 77°31′17″E

Geography
- Location: Radhapuram taluk of Tirunelveli District, Tamil Nadu (India)
- Parent range: Western Ghats

Climbing
- Easiest route: Hike/scramble

Mahendragiri is a hill in India in Tirunelveli District, South Tamil Nadu. The hill is located in Tirunelveli District and is part of the southern range of the Western Ghats, with an elevation of 1,645.2 metres (5,398 ft).

The ISRO Propulsion Complex, a test facility for Indian Space Research Organisation's launch vehicle and satellite propulsion systems, is situated on the lower slopes of this mountain.

Mahendragiri R.F is the reserve forest at the Thovalai taluk of Kanniyakumari district. Madhwa Hindu sect's saint Shri Vadiraja Tirtha has described Mahendra Parvata (Mahendra giri) in his pilgrimage travelogue Tirtha Prabandha.
