= Liquid Propulsion Systems Centre =

ISRO India research centre

Liquid Propulsion Systems Centre (LPSC)
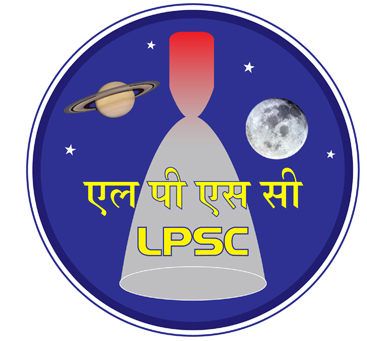
- LPSC seal

- ISRO logo

Agency overview
- Formed: 30 November 1985; 40 years ago
- Jurisdiction: Department of Space
- Headquarters: Thiruvananthapuram
- Employees: 1,294 (as of 1 March 2026)
- Agency executive: Mr. Jayan N., Director
- Parent agency: ISRO
- Website: lpsc.gov.in

The Liquid Propulsion Systems Centre (LPSC) is a research and development centre functioning under ISRO. It has two units located at Valiamala, in Thiruvananthapuram, Kerala, and Bengaluru, Karnataka. LPSC is augmented by ISRO Propulsion Complex at Mahendragiri of Tamil Nadu.

LPSC is engaged in development of liquid and cryogenic propulsion stages for launch vehicles and auxiliary propulsion systems for both launch vehicles and satellites. Activities related to liquid propulsion stages, cryogenic propulsion stages and control systems for launch vehicles and spacecraft is done at Thiruvananthapuram. Precision fabrication facilities, development of transducers and integration of satellite propulsion systems are carried out at Bangalore. The developmental and flight tests along with assembly and integration are done at ISRO Propulsion Complex, Mahendragiri in Tamil Nadu.

The development of liquid propellant stages for the PSLV, control systems for SLV-3, ASLV, PSLV and GSLV, satellite propulsion systems including those for INSAT and IRS and production of pressure transducers are done by the LPSC for India. The LPSC has developed indigenous cryogenic upper stage for Geosynchronous Satellite Launch Vehicle (GSLV) which was successfully test fired by ISRO on 4 August 2007. LPSC is currently developing a restartable LOX-Methane engine and stages for the Next Generation Launch Vehicle, which uses a reusable booster stage.

LPSC's current director is Mr. Jayan N.

== LPSC Trivandrum ==
This unit serves as LPSC headquarters, and is involved in research and development of Earth-storable and cryogenic propulsion for launch vehicles. It delivers engines, stages, associated control systems and components for launch vehicle and spacecraft.

The main activities carried out at Valiamala include:

- Research and Development in earth storable and cryogenic propulsion systems for Launch Vehicle and Spacecraft applications
- System design and architecture
- Management of system projects
- Management of earth storable and cryogenic engine and stage systems
- Integration of launch vehicle propulsion control system packages and modules
- Low thrust thruster test facilities for satellite thrusters

== LPSC Bangalore ==
This unit caters predominantly to propulsion requirements of satellite programmes of ISRO apart from development of indigenous sensors and transducers. The activities that are carried out here include:

- Design and realisation of monopropellant thrusters and components
- Integration of spacecraft propulsion systems
- Development and production of transducers
- Management of launch vehicle stage tanks and structures at industries

== IPRC Mahendragiri ==
On 1 February 2014, this unit was renamed as Indian Space Research Organisation (ISRO) Propulsion Complex and was also made an autonomous department under ISRO. The Mahendragiri unit was previously functioning under LPSC in Valiamala. The main activities carried out at here are:

- Assembly and integration of liquid engines and stages
- Testing of liquid engines and stages
- High altitude test facilities for upper stage engines
- Propellant storage facilities

== See also ==
- Indian Space Research Organisation
- Vikram Sarabhai Space Centre
- Satish Dhawan Space Centre
- Indian Institute of Space Science and Technology
