= Satellite-Protection Project =

Indian initiative to protect space assets

The Satellite-Protection Project is an Indian governmental program that aims to protect India's orbiting satellites, and space assets from foreign spacecraft. The program was launched, following a near-collision incident in mid-2024, where a satellite from a neighboring country came close to 1 km of an Indian satellite used for military mapping and monitoring. The project is part of a broader government effort to develop and launch more security assets into space. The ISRO-developed initiative intends to defend Indian satellites against any attacks from adversaries, particularly China.

The India government plans to invest ₹27,000 crore (US$2.8 billion) in 52 surveillance satellites, the first of which is anticipated to launch in 2026, as part of SBS Phase-III under Space Based Surveillance Project to build more military assets in orbit. Policymakers in India started discussing about ways to safeguard the nation's growing space assets against hostile space maneuvers, hacking, and unintended or intended collisions after the 2024 event. One of the ideas being discussed is the creation of 'Bodyguard Satellites', which would hover close to important Indian space assets, keeping an eye on their surroundings, and will intervene if something else approaches too closely.

== Background ==
For the sake of national security, India has been formulating plans to bolster its defenses against orbital threats to its satellites. In 2019, ISRO established the Directorate of Space Situational Awareness and Management to protect sensitive space assets from coming into contact with space debris and collisions. In December 2020, the Space Situational Awareness Control Center became part of the ISRO Telemetry, Tracking and Command Network. The first milestone was the launch of Network for Space Object Tracking and Analysis (Project NETRA), which included a radar and an optical telescope facility.

The Indian Armed Forces relied heavily on satellites during 2025 India–Pakistan conflict. In 2024, a satellite from a neighboring country came within 1 km of one of ISRO's satellites, which were orbiting at an altitude of 500–600 km (310–370 miles), while it was doing tasks that could have military ramifications, such as mapping and tracking ground-based objects. Despite the fact that there was no collision between the two satellites, Indian authorities saw the unusually close approach as an aggressive move intended to test the other nation's capabilities. Since gaining independence from British Raj in 1947, India has engaged in multiple conflicts with China and Pakistan. In comparison, India has 100 satellites in orbit as of 2025, Pakistan has 8, and China has around 930. In an effort to improve border security and coastal monitoring, ISRO Chairman V. Narayanan announced on April 23, 2025, that India would launch an additional 100–150 satellites to cover the entire nation by 2028.

The increasing danger from China's People's Liberation Army in space is causing concern among Indian and American leaders. Beijing has rapidly expanded the scope and sophistication of its satellite program. In May 2025, ISRO demonstrated its preparedness for orbital defense, when it successfully performed a high-speed satellite rendezvous in space as part of the SpaDeX mission. The two satellites, SDX01 and SDX02, were coaxed into high-speed, coordinated contact at an orbital speed of 28,800 kmph. Under controlled conditions, the satellites gradually closed in on each other, testing autonomous control systems, orbital control, and real-time communication. The exercise mimicked the maneuvering accuracy required in space warfare. The test was conducted after US Vice Chief of Space Operations Gen. Michael Guetlein made comments about China's pursuit of several proximity operations—in which space objects move in and out of and around one another in unison and under control—at the 16th annual McAleese "Defense Programs" Conference in Arlington.

== Planning and development ==
The ISRO System for Safe and Sustainable Space Operations & Management (IS4OM) became operational in July 2022 with the aim of ensuring the safety of Indian space assets. IS4OM's goals are to detect and monitor space objects and the space environment, process observations to determine orbit, characterize and catalog objects, analyze how the space environment has changed over time, evaluate and reduce risks, and work together and share data with different agencies.

The Defence Space Agency was established to collaborate with ISRO, Defence Research and Development Organisation, and the armed forces, integrate military space activities, and manage critical space assets. With objectives for both space exploration and security, India's Space Policy was unveiled in April 2023. It promoted greater private sector involvement in satellite development, surveillance technologies, and international collaboration with the United States, France, and Quadrilateral Security Dialogue partners to improve space security and operational resilience. Strategic ambiguity regarding kinetic anti-satellite testing is part of India's orbital defense strategy that permits deterrence flexibility while upholding international standards and reducing the formation of debris.

Following Operation Sindoor, space-based intelligence, surveillance, and reconnaissance capabilities are widely seen as essential to national security in India's strategic community. In reaction to China's increasing space warfare capabilities and the swift militarization of orbit, India stepped up its efforts to fortify its space-based defense system. India intends to employ a multi-layered approach to safeguard its space assets, including bodyguard satellites, radars, cybersecurity measures, surveillance satellites, and solar monitoring. The bodyguard satellites will be designed to combat threats like cyberattacks, communication jamming, and physical interference from hostile satellites. They will be positioned to safeguard valuable military satellites and will have a great degree of maneuverability. When they are near enough, they may identify the weak spots of enemy satellites and use robots or lasers to counter them, protecting space assets and conducting surveillance.

On March 8, 2025, Indian startup Digantara launched SCOT (Space Camera for Object Tracking), world's first commercial space surveillance satellite. The satellite has a high revisit rate and is designed to track and monitor objects as small as 5 cm for regular and precise studies of orbital activity. SCOT has been deployed in a sun-synchronous orbit to track objects in low earth orbit more efficiently than existing sensors, which are limited by field of vision, weather, and topography.

The Indian government and the private sector will collaborate to launch Light Detection and Ranging satellites as part of the Satellite-Protection Project in order to detect threats more quickly. This will allow ground control enough time to give commands for the targeted satellite to realign itself. According to Sudheer Kumar N, a former director of ISRO's Capacity Building Program Office, the LiDAR satellites would need to be part of a bigger system that also included ground-based radars and telescopes. Compared to traditional radar, the laser-based sensors would produce accurate three-dimensional maps of surrounding orbiting objects, allowing for quicker and more accurate threat identification.

=== Satellite Mapping Project ===
The Ministry of Defence is preparing a constellation of satellites to monitor foreign satellites spying on India. The MoD is working on the project, under Atmanirbhar Bharat initiative, which will feature satellite mapping capabilities. This satellite network would enable India monitor orbital threats in real time and improve its space domain awareness. It will be connected to Project NETRA. The MoD will collaborate with ISRO to supervise the satellites' overall design and monitoring, while Digantara, a space startup, has been hired to launch the satellites by 2026. The annual contract is valued at ₹150 crore (US$16 million). The Indian government is exploring this as part of a larger, more comprehensive space monitoring system. The susceptibility of satellite communications was made clear during the Russo-Ukrainian war. As of 2025, India is unable to do continuous, 24-hour in-orbit tracking. The need to continuously monitor its orbital surroundings would be met by the Satellite Mapping Project.

== Criticism ==
Although the Satellite-Protection Project aims to improve security, skeptics contend that it could trigger an arms race in space and possibly breach the 1967 Outer Space Treaty, which allows conventional systems but prohibits nuclear weapons in orbit. Indian officials claim that the move is defensive in nature and that its goal is to protect assets rather than exacerbate tensions.

== See also ==
- Geosynchronous Space Situational Awareness Program - United States
- Kosmos satellites, Oko satellites - Russia
- Essaim, Hélios 1B, Helios 2, Composante Spatiale Optique - France
- SAR-Lupe - Germany
- Near Earth Object Surveillance Satellite, Sapphire - Canada
- Space Based Surveillance project (India) - India

Space surveillance radars

- Air Force Space Surveillance System - United States
- GRAVES - France

General concepts

- Militarisation of space
- Outer Space Treaty
