= Space Based Surveillance project (India) =

Multi-phased Indian programme to launch spy satellites

The Space Based Surveillance project is a series of programmes undertaken by the Government of India to launch a constellation of satellites for earth observation roles. The satellites are primarily meant to serve the Indian Armed Forces through the Defence Space Agency. India plans to deploye about 150 satellites for military roles.

== SBS Phase-I ==
The Phase-I project was approved by the PM Atal Bihari Vajpeyee in 2001. The ISRO satellites Cartosat-2A, Cartosat-2B, RISAT-1 and RISAT-2 — were funded launched from India.

== SBS Phase-II ==
The Phase-II project was approved by the government on 2013 as a part of which 6 satellites — Cartosat-2C, Cartosat-2D, Cartosat-3A, Cartosat-3B, Microsat-TD, Microsat-R and RISAT-2A — were approved for development and launch. Microsat-R was the target satellite for India's ASAT Test in 2019 — Mission Shakti.

== SBS Phase-III ==
On 12 October 2024, India's Cabinet Committee on Security approved a proposal for the development, construction and launch of a constellation of 52 spy satellites as a part of the Space Based Surveillance Phase-III project. The project is worth ₹26,968 crore (equivalent to ₹290 billion or US$3.0 billion in 2026) and meant to strengthen the nation’s surveillance capabilities across both terrestrial and maritime domains. This will be supervised by the National Security Council Secretariat along with the Defence Space Agency, under the Integrated Defence Staff. The constellation will also enhance the SATCOM capabilities of long range UAV fleet of the Armed Forces including the MQ-9B Predator drones then expected to enter service in 2028. All the satellites is to be launched within 5 years at Geosynchronous Equatorial Orbit and Low Earth Orbit. The satellites will be equipped with artificial intelligence for inter-satellite communications.

As part of the project, 21 satellites will be co-developed by ISRO and France (under an LOI agreement for “defence space cooperation”) while the rest of 31 satellites are to be developed by three private sector companies. The role of these satellites would be surveillance, reconnaissance, communication and other strategic purposes. The CCS has also, reportedly, approved two agencies to develop multiple types of defensive and offensive capabilities from space. Under the same project, few experiments would be conducted for an integrated LEO and MEO satellite-based communication system which is a requirement for the Indian Air Force and the Indian Navy. The first batch of satellites will be launched in 2027–28. The agreements were formalized by September 2026.

Following the 2025 India–Pakistan conflict, the project was expedited, according to reports dated 30 June 2025. The first batch of satellites is now anticipated to launch in April 2026, with the full fleet of satellites to be deployed by the end of 2029. While private companies have been instructed to increase the pace of satellite production, additional efforts are apparently being made "to launch the satellites faster" into space. India intends to shrink its OODA loop as well. In order to scan and monitor hostile aircraft, drones, or missiles, as well as to cue weapon systems for interception, SBS Phase-III will be connected to air defense assets and radars under Mission Sudarshan Chakra.

In order to scan and monitor hostile aircraft, drones, or missiles, as well as to cue weapon systems for interception, SBS Phase-III will be connected to air defense assets and radars under Mission Sudarshan Chakra.

As part of the plan, the project will add night-image capability and will also establish overseas ground stations with local government approval. The night vision capacity will be added by deploying satellites equipped with synthetic-aperture radar. Development of bodyguard satellites is also being undertaken to deter any threat to the surveillance satellites. Technology for inter-satellite data transfer is also being developed.Private players have also been invited to build Technology demonstrators. Further, the first batch of satellite might be launched by April 2026.

== See also ==
- TSAT-1A
- Mission Shakti
- Defence Space Agency
- Defence Support Program
- Satellite-Protection Project
