= ISRO spin-off technologies =

Overview of the spinoff technologies by Indian Space Research Organisation

ISRO spin-off technologies are commercial products and services which have been developed with the help of ISRO, through research and development, licensing of ISRO patents, use of ISRO facilities, technical assistance from ISRO personnel, or data from ISRO research. So far 300 technologies have been transferred to Indian industries and licensee industries to manufacture and market the products. NewSpace India Limited was set up to market spin-off technologies and products and services both in India and abroad. Antrix Corporation was also established in September 1992 to commercialize space products.

== Products ==
Below are spinoff products developed by ISRO.

=== Adhesives ===
ISRO has developed various structural and non-structural adhesives. silicon based, polyurethane elastomers and acrylic based adhesives are Non-structural. Epoxy resins, phenol based and rubber based adhesives using chloroprene and neoprene are Structural. These adhesives can be used in automobile and other engineering industries.

=== Thermal barrier ===
Unnamed thermal barrier used in cryogenic fuel tanks made up of hydrophobic silica aerogel has low thermal conductivity, density, and high specific surface area. It can be used as thermal insulator to manufacture winter clothes and boots of soldiers stationed in extremely cold regions.

=== Left ventricular assist device ===
Using lightweight rocket material, ISRO has developed a low-cost heart pump that assists the human heart, notably in cases of left ventricle failure. The device is composed of a special bio-compatible titanium alloy and can pump 3-5 litres of blood every minute. It has been experimented on animals, and it was found to be successful.

=== Other ===
- Distress Alert Transmitter (DAT)
- NavIC messaging receiver
- MSS type-C reporting terminal for automated train tracking
- TRISP power module
- Endoscopic Catheter Mounted Impedance Probe to Assess Mucosal Health.
- Capacitive Sensor to detect malignancy in Leukocytes
- ISRO smart limb: low-cost bionic limb for amputees.
- Artificial Polyurethane Foot
- Fire Extinguishing Powders
- PARAS-3D (Parallel Aerodynamic Simulator) Software
- Search and Rescue Beacon
- IGiS: Indigenous Geographic and Image Processing Software package
- Automatic Weather Station
- Silica Cloth (ISROSIL)
- CASPOL: Fire retardant coating
- DTH Based Disaster Warning system (DWS)
- Sliprings
- Agrophotometer
- Pedclean
- Pressure Transducers
- Ultrasonic Liquid Level Sensor
- Fibre Optic Liquid Level Sensor
- Dual Polarization LIDAR- DPL
- Lower Atmospheric Wind Profiler-LAWP
- Precision Tapping Attachment
- Photosynthesis Irradiance incubation (PI) Box
- Ground Penetration Radars
- Digital Holographic Testing Machine
- Artificial Denture Material-ACRAMID
- Doppler Weather Radar (DWR)
- Phantom Connectivity
- QPad Mobile GIS-GPS Software
- Vibration Management Solution
- Elastomagnetic Abrasive Spheres for Fine Finishing

== See also ==
- NASA spin-off technologies
