= Project NETRA =

ISRO's space-debris tracking system

Project NETRA (Network for space object TRacking and Analysis) is an indigenous space-situational-awareness (SSA) initiative of ISRO. Announced publicly in September 2019, the programme gives India an independent capability to monitor, catalogue and predict orbital debris and near-Earth objects that could endanger Indian satellites.

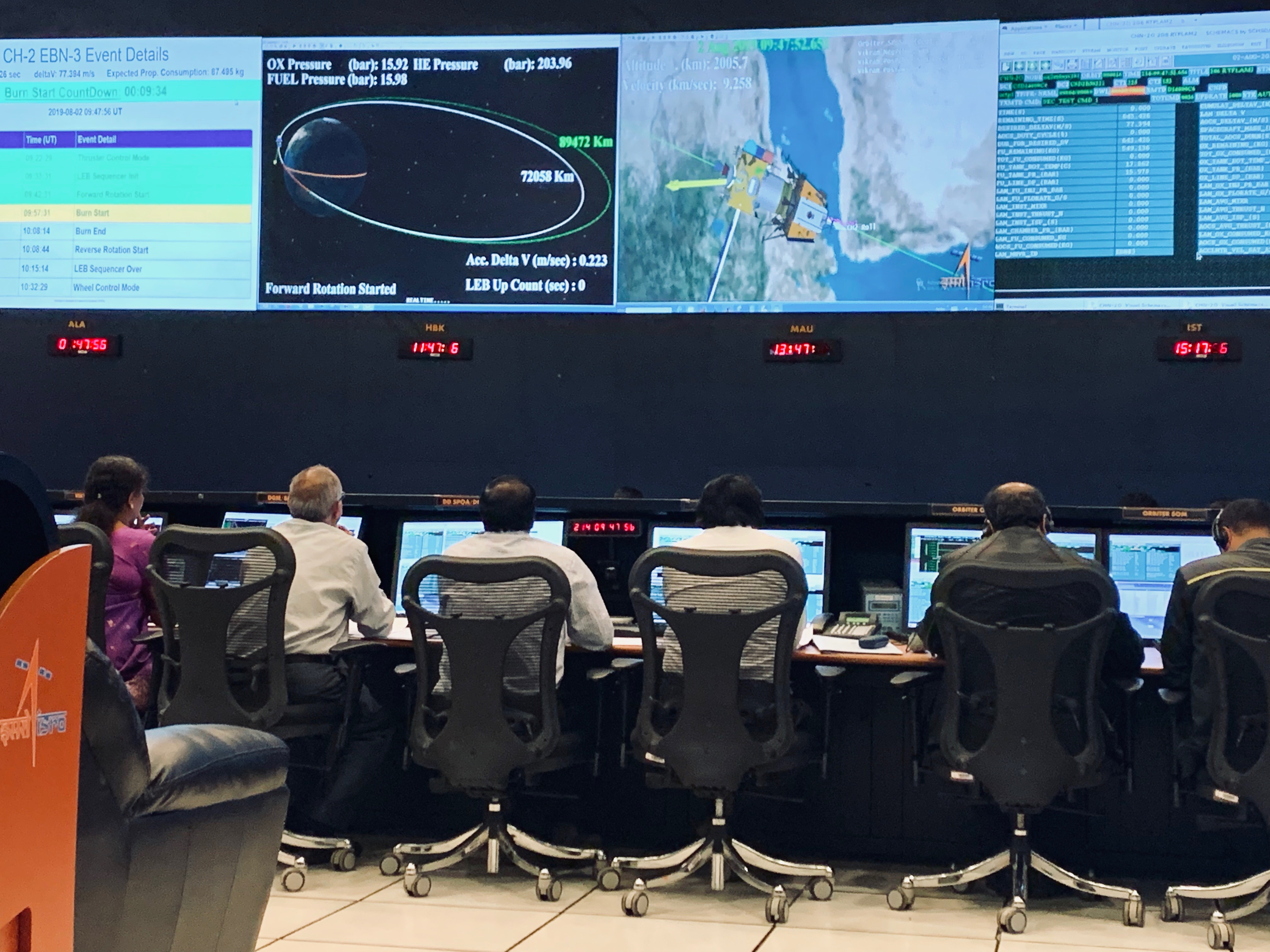
ISRO’s Mission Operations Complex (MOX-1) at ISTRAC, Bengaluru – central hub for Project NETRA

== Background ==
Orbital congestion has intensified with mega-constellations and anti-satellite tests, raising collision risk for India’s fleet of more than 50 operational satellites. Until NETRA, ISRO relied largely on publicly available data from the United States Space Command. A 2021 internal report noted that ISRO carried out 19 collision-avoidance manoeuvres that year, up from three in 2015.

== Development timeline ==
- 2015 – Multi-Object Tracking Radar (MOTR) commissioned at Sriharikota as a precursor SSA asset.
- 2019 – Project NETRA formally sanctioned with an initial outlay of ₹400 crore.
- 2020 – The dedicated SSA Control Centre “NETRA” at ISTRAC, Bengaluru, inaugurated by then ISRO chairman Dr K. Sivan alongside multiple industry dignitaries.
- 2024 – ISRO released its first Indian Space Situational Assessment Report (ISSAR) compiled using NETRA data.
- 2025 – ISRO chairman Dr V. Narayanan inspected the Chandrapur (Assam) radar site; construction of India’s first dedicated debris-tracking phased-array radar began.

== Architecture and capabilities ==
Project NETRA integrates:

- Phased-array radars – including MOTR and the forthcoming Chandrapur system.
- Optical telescope network – High-altitude observatories at Ponmudi, Mount Abu and Leh reach apparent magnitude 14.
- Data fusion & control centre – Operated by the Directorate of Space Situational Awareness and Management (DSSAM) under Dr A. K. Anilkumar, the Bengaluru hub ingests sensor data, correlates orbits, predicts conjunctions and issues alerts.

Sensors can detect debris as small as 10 cm in low Earth orbit (LEO) and larger objects in geosynchronous orbit (GEO).

== Strategic significance ==
NETRA strengthens India’s technological self-reliance while enhancing national security. An indigenous catalogue reduces reaction time for collision-avoidance and supports planned debris-removal missions and human-spaceflight programmes.

== International context ==
India shares SSA data with global partners and participates in the Inter-Agency Space Debris Coordination Committee (IADC). Analysts view NETRA as elevating India to peer status with the United States, Europe and Japan in cooperative SSA.

== Future plans ==
ISRO intends to:

- Deploy additional radars for nationwide all-weather coverage.
- Integrate NETRA with the Debris-Free Space Missions (DFSM) initiative targeting zero-debris launches by 2030.
- Explore active debris-removal technologies with domestic start-ups.

== See also ==
- Space Situational Awareness
- Low Earth orbit
