= List of SSLV launches =

Launches made by India's Small Satellite Launch Vehicle family of rockets

This article lists all the previous and planned launches by ISRO using Small Satellite Launch Vehicle (SSLV).

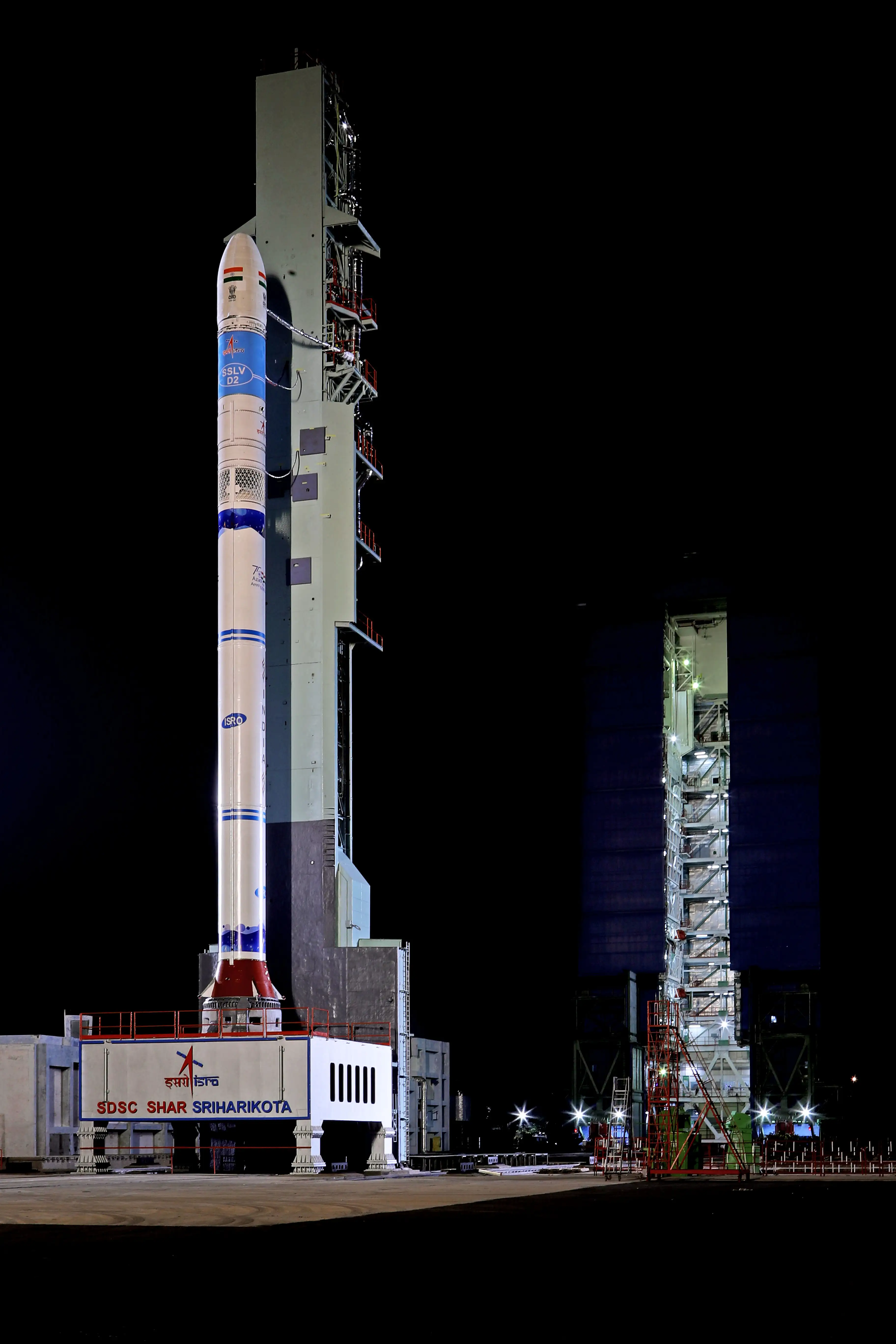
SSLV flight D2 during rollout.

== Launch statistics ==
- Failure
- Partial failure
- Success
- Planned

Decade-wise summary of SSLV launches

Decade	Successful	Partial success	Failure	Total
2020s	2	0	1	3

== Launch history ==
=== 2022–2029 ===
Date/Time (UTC)	Payload	Launch site	Regime	Status
Date/Time (UTC)	Payload	Flight Number	Operator	Function
Date/Time (UTC)	Remarks			
7 August 2022; 03:48	(India) EOS 02 (India) AzaadiSAT; 143 kg (315 lb)	Satish Dhawan FLP	LEO (intended); TAO (achieved)	Failure
7 August 2022; 03:48	(India) EOS 02 (India) AzaadiSAT; 143 kg (315 lb)	SSLV-D1	ISRO	Earth observation
7 August 2022; 03:48	The first developmental flight of SSLV. The mission target was a circular orbit of altitude 356.2 km with 37.2° inclination. The mission carried two satellite payloads. The 135 kg EOS 02, an Earth observation satellite and the 8 kg AzaadiSAT CubeSat. Due to sensor failure coupled with shortcomings of onboard software, the stage as well as the two satellite payloads were injected into an unstable transatmospheric Earth orbit measuring 356×76 km and subsequently destroyed upon reentry. According to S. Somanath, an anomaly lasting 2 seconds in one of the accelerometers during second stage separation initiated salvage mode by onboard computer. Guidance, navigation, and control software switched from 'closed loop guidance' where it received real-time feedback from all sensors to an 'open loop guidance' where accelerometer data gets isolated and a predetermined path is followed. This resulted in velocity shortfall from the required 7.3 km/s to 7.2 km/s. Being in salvage mode, Velocity-Trimming Module didn't rectify this shortfall which led to mission failure.			
10 February 2023; 03:48	(India) EOS-07 (United States) Janus-1 (India) AzaadiSAT-2; 156.3 kg (345 lb); 11.5 kg (25 lb); 7.3 kg (16 lb)	Satish Dhawan FLP	LEO	Success
10 February 2023; 03:48	(India) EOS-07 (United States) Janus-1 (India) AzaadiSAT-2; 156.3 kg (345 lb); 11.5 kg (25 lb); 7.3 kg (16 lb)	SSLV-D2	ISRO	Earth observation
10 February 2023; 03:48	Second developmental flight of the SSLV. The purpose of SSLV-D2 is to launch EOS-07, Janus-1 and AzaadiSAT-2 into a 450-kilometer circular orbit and showcase the in-flight performance of the SSLV vehicle systems. According to SSLV-D1 fault evaluation study, six onboard accelerometers detected vibrations that were longer in duration and more intense during the second stage of separation. In order to ensure that this problem doesn't occur again, the second stage detachment system in SSLV-D2 was modified to reduce vibrations. Furthermore, the system was redesigned to navigate utilizing NavIC data and readings will now be monitored for a longer time before entering rescue mode. The separation mechanism, the equipment bay, and the on-board system for identifying malfunctioning sensors were further modified and five new pieces of hardware were installed. The electronics in SSLV-D2 worked successfully, as did the launch vehicle's new, affordable guidance and navigation system.			
16 August 2024; 03:47	(India) EOS-08 (India) SR-0 DEMOSAT; 175.5 kg (387 lb); 0.2 kg (0.44 lb)	Satish Dhawan FLP	LEO	Success
16 August 2024; 03:47	(India) EOS-08 (India) SR-0 DEMOSAT; 175.5 kg (387 lb); 0.2 kg (0.44 lb)	SSLV-D3	ISRO	Earth observation
16 August 2024; 03:47	Third developmental flight and completion of SSLV Development Project. The development team will continue to search for specific operational activities in the VTM stage before ISRO supplies the industry with SSLV technology for serial production. Any necessary fine-tuning will be finished prior to the technology transfer. Repeatable flight performance of the SSLV vehicle systems has also been demonstrated by SSLV-D3.			

== Future launches ==
Date / time (UTC)	Rocket, Configuration	Launch site	Payload	Orbit	User
October 2026	SSLV	SHAR	(India) TBD (India) PARIKSHIT		ISRO
October 2026	Flight L1. First serial flight of the SSLV.				
March 2027	SSLV	SHAR	(India) SBS-3 (India) Azista60°		ISRO
March 2027	Flight L2.				
2026	SSLV	SHAR	(Australia) Optimus	LEO	Space Machines Company
2026	Space MAITRI (Mission for Australia-India's Technology, Research and Innovation). First dedicated commercial SSLV launch. Payload weight 450 kg.				
TBD	SSLV	SHAR	(United States) BlackSky Global-5, 6, and two others	LEO	Spaceflight Industries
TBD	Manifested on a future SSLV commercial flight, four 56 kg BlackSky Technology Inc. satellites to be placed at 50° inclination of circular orbit to ~500 km.				

== See also ==
- List of PSLV launches
- List of GSLV launches
- List of LVM3 launches
