= Plankton, Aerosol, Cloud, ocean Ecosystem =

NASA Earth observation satellite

Plankton, Aerosol, Cloud, ocean Ecosystem (PACE)
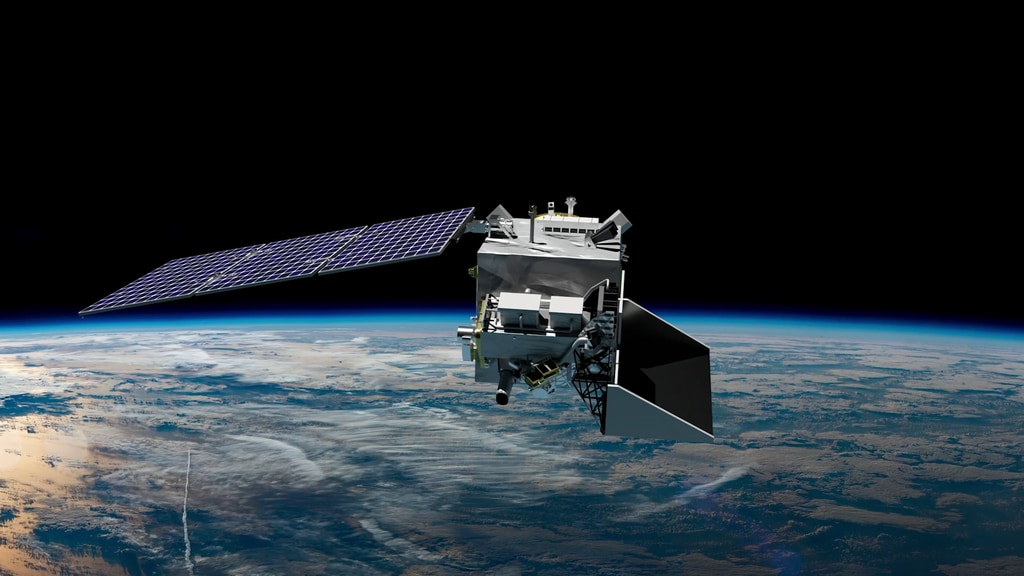
- An artist's concept of NASA's PACE spacecraft in orbit.
- Names: Pre-Aerosol, Cloud, and ocean Ecosystem
- Mission type: Remote sensing
- Operator: NASA / GSFC
- COSPAR ID: 2024-025A
- SATCAT no.: 58928
- Website: pace.oceansciences.org/home.htm
- Mission duration: 3–10 years (planned); 2 years, 9 months, 9 days (elapsed)

Spacecraft properties
- Spacecraft: PACE
- Manufacturer: Goddard Space Flight Center
- Launch mass: 1,694 kg (3,735 lb)
- Dimensions: 1.5 m × 1.5 m × 3.2 m (4 ft 11 in × 4 ft 11 in × 10 ft 6 in)
- Power: 1000 watts

Start of mission
- Launch date: 06:33, February 8, 2024 (UTC)
- Rocket: Falcon 9 Block 5 B1081-4
- Launch site: Cape Canaveral, SLC‑40
- Contractor: SpaceX

Orbital parameters
- Reference system: Geocentric orbit
- Regime: Sun-synchronous orbit
- Eccentricity: 0.0012±0.0004
- Altitude: 675–710 km (419–441 mi)
- Inclination: 97°
- Period: ~90 minutes

Transponders
- Band: S-Band: Command & Telemetry; Ka-Band: Science Data
Instruments
- OCI: Ocean Color Instrument
- SPEXone: Spectro-Polarimeter for Planetary Exploration
- HARP2: Hyper-Angular Rainbow Polarimeter 2
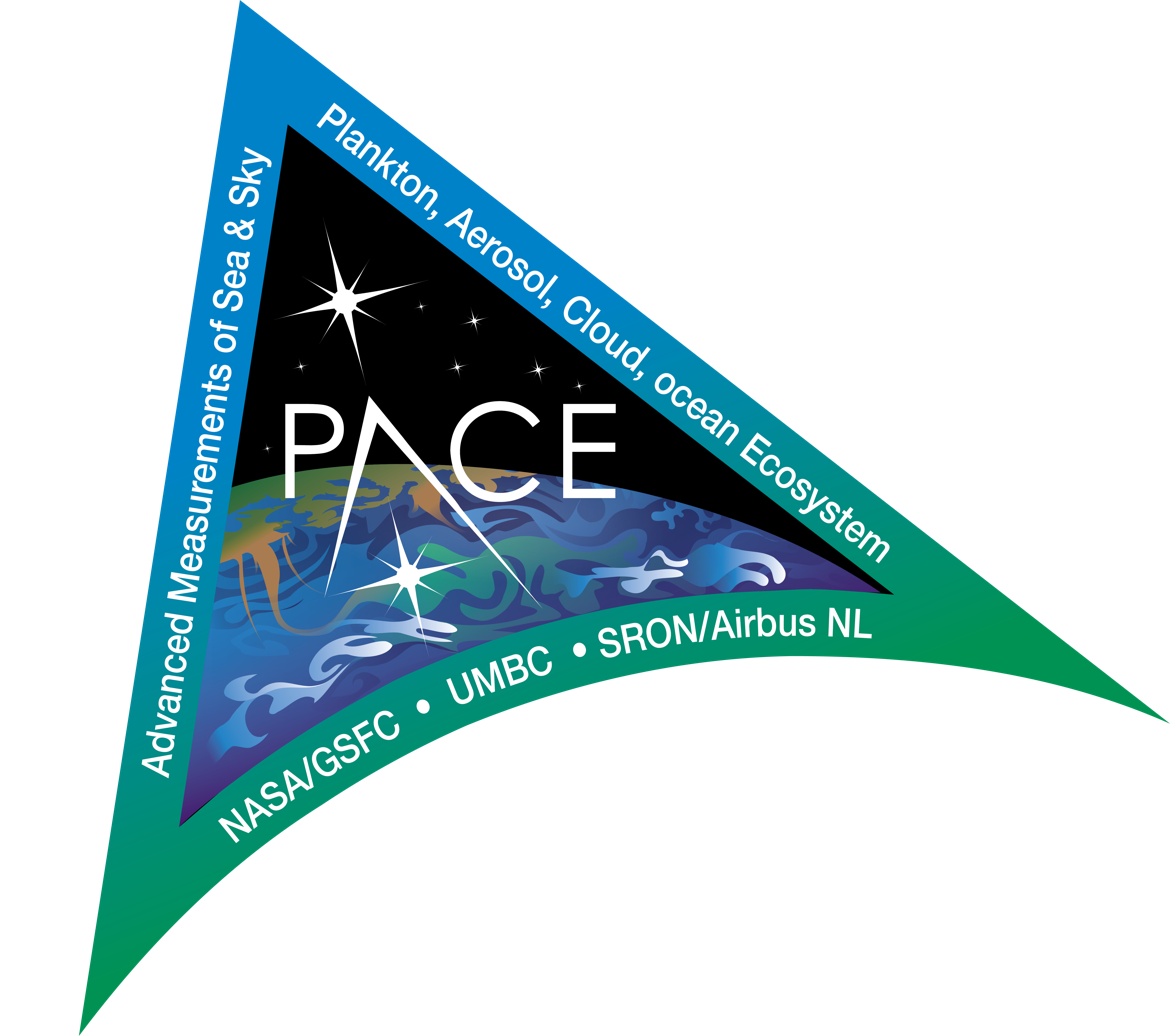
- PACE mission logo Large Strategic Science Missions; Earth Science Division

Plankton, Aerosol, Cloud, ocean Ecosystem (PACE) is a 2020s NASA Earth-observing satellite mission to observe global ocean color, biogeochemistry, and ecology, as well as the carbon cycle, aerosols and clouds. PACE is intended to be used to identify the extent and duration of phytoplankton blooms and improve understanding of air quality. These and other uses of PACE data are expected to benefit the economy and society according to NASA, especially sectors that rely on water quality, fisheries and food security.

Despite being proposed for cancellation under President Trump's FY 2018 budget, the program was funded by Congress in 2018. The PACE project is managed by NASA Goddard Space Flight Center. The main instrument and bus were designed and built at Goddard Space Flight Center.

On 4 February 2020, NASA announced the selection of SpaceX to launch PACE on a Falcon 9, at a total cost to NASA of US$80.4 million, including the launch service and other mission-related costs. The total cost of the mission is $964 million, which includes spacecraft construction, launch, and operations. PACE successfully launched on 8 February 2024 at 06:33 UTC. On 17 April 2024 it was announced that first operational data was received.

== History ==
The Pre-Aerosol, Cloud, and ocean Ecosystem satellite (PACE) was approved to move forward out of its preliminary stage of planning on 16 June 2016 at the Key Decision Point-A (KDP-A) event. According to project manager Andre Dress, a significant milestone for the next stage was that the official mission budget became available for use on 1 July 2016.

== Science overview ==
PACE has two fundamental science goals: "to extend key systematic ocean color, aerosol, and cloud data records for Earth system and climate studies, and to address new and emerging science questions using its advanced instruments, surpassing the capabilities of previous and current missions".

PACE will measure atmospheric particles and clouds that scatter and absorb sunlight. Improved characterization of aerosol particles will enable quantifying their impact on marine biology and ocean chemistry, as well as Earth's energy budget and ecological forecasting. PACE will enable scientists to better monitor fisheries, identify harmful algal blooms, and observe changes in marine resources. The color of the ocean is determined by the interaction of sunlight with substances or particles present in seawater such as chlorophyll, a green pigment found in most phytoplankton species. By monitoring global phytoplankton distribution and abundance, the mission will contribute toward understanding the complex systems that drive ocean ecology. PACE has enabled new observations of the terrestrial ecosystem to better estimates of planet growth by using its unique hyperspectral observations.

=== Ocean Color Observations ===
PACE observes Ocean Color through its OCI and builds off previous satellites observations (i.e. SeaWiFS, MODIS, and VIIRS) by incorporating its the unique hyperspectral, ultraviolate (UV) and Short Wave Infrared (SWIR) observations. Previous satellites have faced challenges in calculating the portion of the reflected light from the ocean which is only ~10% of light that reaches the satellite, a process called atmospheric correction. PACE's observations in the UV and SWIR have greatly improved the atmospheric correction process. Also PACE's use of hyperspectral imagery has allowed from advancements in detecting Phytoplankton Community Composition from space.

Scientists have been able to apply algorithms to PACE's hyperspectral observations to develop products that measure globally and daily the composition of phytoplankton communities. This is done by looking at the distinct signals that different phytoplankton taxa absorb and reflect based on their differences in their size, morphology, pigmentation, and physiology. The unique abortion from different phytoplankton taxa can be linked to the amount of carbon the community holds which has helped research's better understand phytoplankton's roll in primary production, the global carbon cycle and biological pump. Additionally PACE can detect the specific wavelength of light that has been absorbed by the phytoplankton via chlorophyll-a along with the small unused portion of absorbed light that is admitted, this signal is the Chlorophyll fluorescence. This signal from Chlorophyll fluorescence is able to detect the phytoplankton communities that are more inducive of fishery growth and is one of the main operational applications of that PACE provides. Furthermore, PACE has been able to monitor the formation of Harmful Algae blooms (HAB) and aims in the future to be able have daily monitoring to make public health decisions.

== Instruments ==
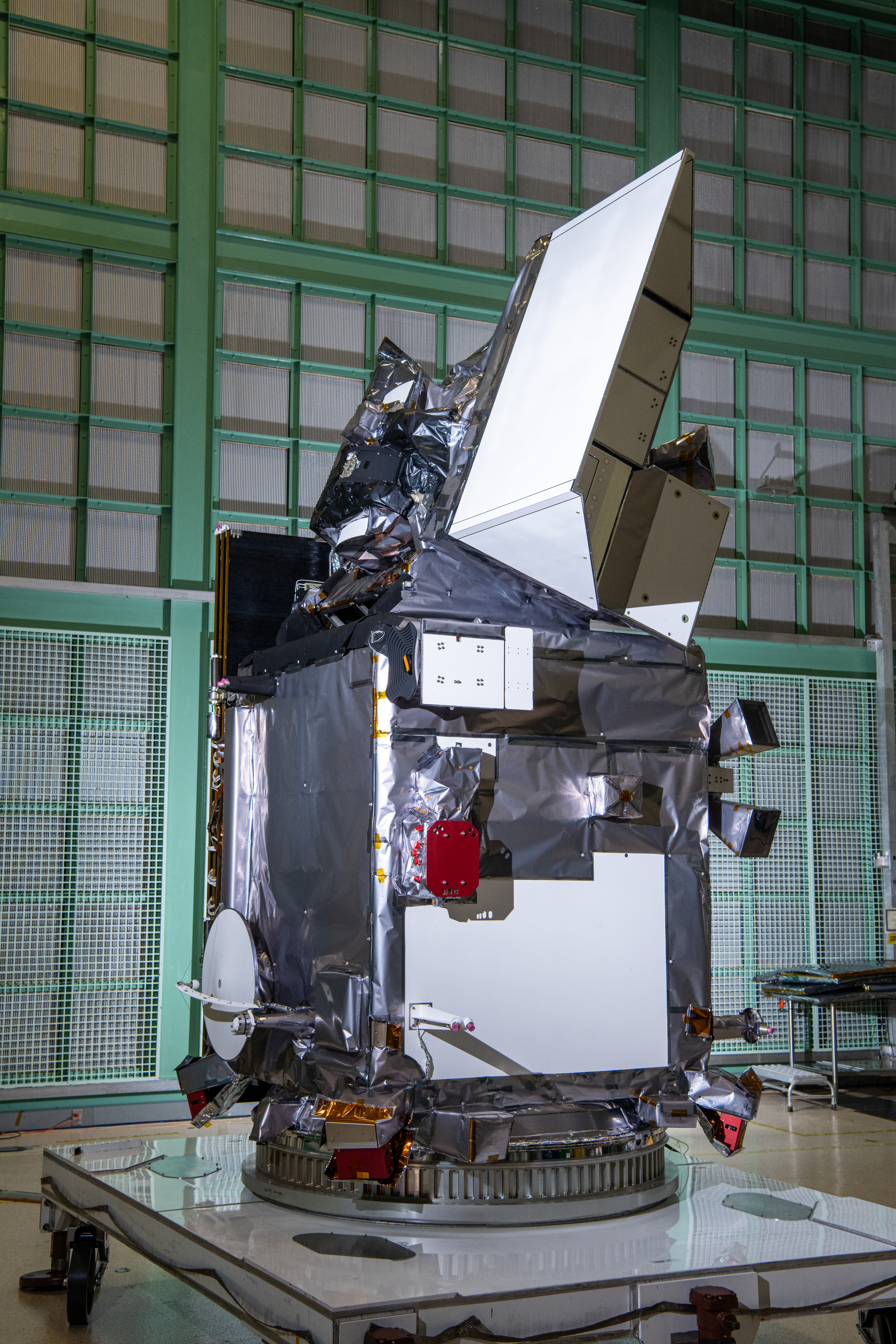
PACE in the clean room

The oceans play a critical role in supporting life on Earth as well as the global economy. To understand changes in ocean health related to climate change; formulation of science objectives and sensor requirements for an advanced ocean biology satellite mission began in the year 2000 with a NASA agency-wide carbon cycle initiative that included ocean, terrestrial, and atmospheric disciplines.

The instrument requirements for this ocean ecology mission are:

- Ocean Color Instrument (OCI), primary sensor, is a highly advanced optical spectrometer that will be used to measure properties of light over portions of the electromagnetic spectrum. It will enable continuous measurement of light at finer wavelength resolution than previous NASA satellite sensors, extending key system ocean color data records for climate studies. It is capable of measuring the color of the ocean from ultraviolet to shortwave infrared. The instrument's continuous coverage extends from 315 nm to 895 nm at 2.5 nm increments, each with 5.0 nm width. Near the chlorophyll-a and oxygen A and B bands, the spectral resolution increases to 1.25 nm steps, still at 5 nm width. The instrument also measures 7 discrete shortwave infrared bands from 940 nm to 2260 nm.
- Spectro-Polarimeter for Planetary Exploration (SPEXone) is a multi-angle polarimeter that provides continuous wavelength coverage in the range 385-770 nm. It measures the intensity, Degree of Linear Polarization (DoLP) and Angle of Linear Polarization (AoLP) of sunlight reflected back from Earth's atmosphere, land surface, and ocean. The focus of the SPEXone development is to achieve a very high accuracy of DoLP measurements, which facilitates accurate characterization of aerosols in the atmosphere. It observes a ground pixel under 5 viewing angles (0°, ±20° and ±58° on ground), where the ±20° viewports will be used for cross-calibration with the OCI. Aerosols are small solid or liquid particles suspended in the air that affect climate directly through interaction with solar radiation. Aerosols affect climate indirectly by changing the micro- and macro-physical properties of clouds. According to the Intergovernmental Panel on Climate Change, aerosols are the largest source of error in quantifying the radiative forcing of climate change. SPEXone will enable measurements of optical and micro-physical properties of aerosols with unprecedented detail and accuracy;
- Hyper-Angular Rainbow Polarimeter #2 (HARP2) is a wide-angle imaging polarimeter designed to measure aerosol particles and clouds, as well as properties of land and water surfaces. The amount and type of particles in suspension in the atmosphere are relevant to applications pertaining to health effects, cloud life cycle and precipitation, climate, etc. HARP2 will combine data from multiple along-track viewing angles (up to 60), four spectral bands in the visible and near infrared ranges, and three angles of linear polarization to measure the microphysical properties of the atmospheric particles including their size distribution, amount, refractive indices and particle shape. HARP2 was designed and built by University of Maryland, Baltimore County (UMBC)'s Earth and Space Institute. The HARP2 instrument was preceded by HARP (HyperAngular Rainbow Polarimeter), a NASA CubeSat that was launched to the ISS on 2 November 2019, deployed from the ISS on 19 February 2020, achieved first light on 15 April 2020 and decayed from orbit on 4 April 2022, COSPAR 1998-067QZ, SATCAT 45256.

== Mission ==
=== Launch ===
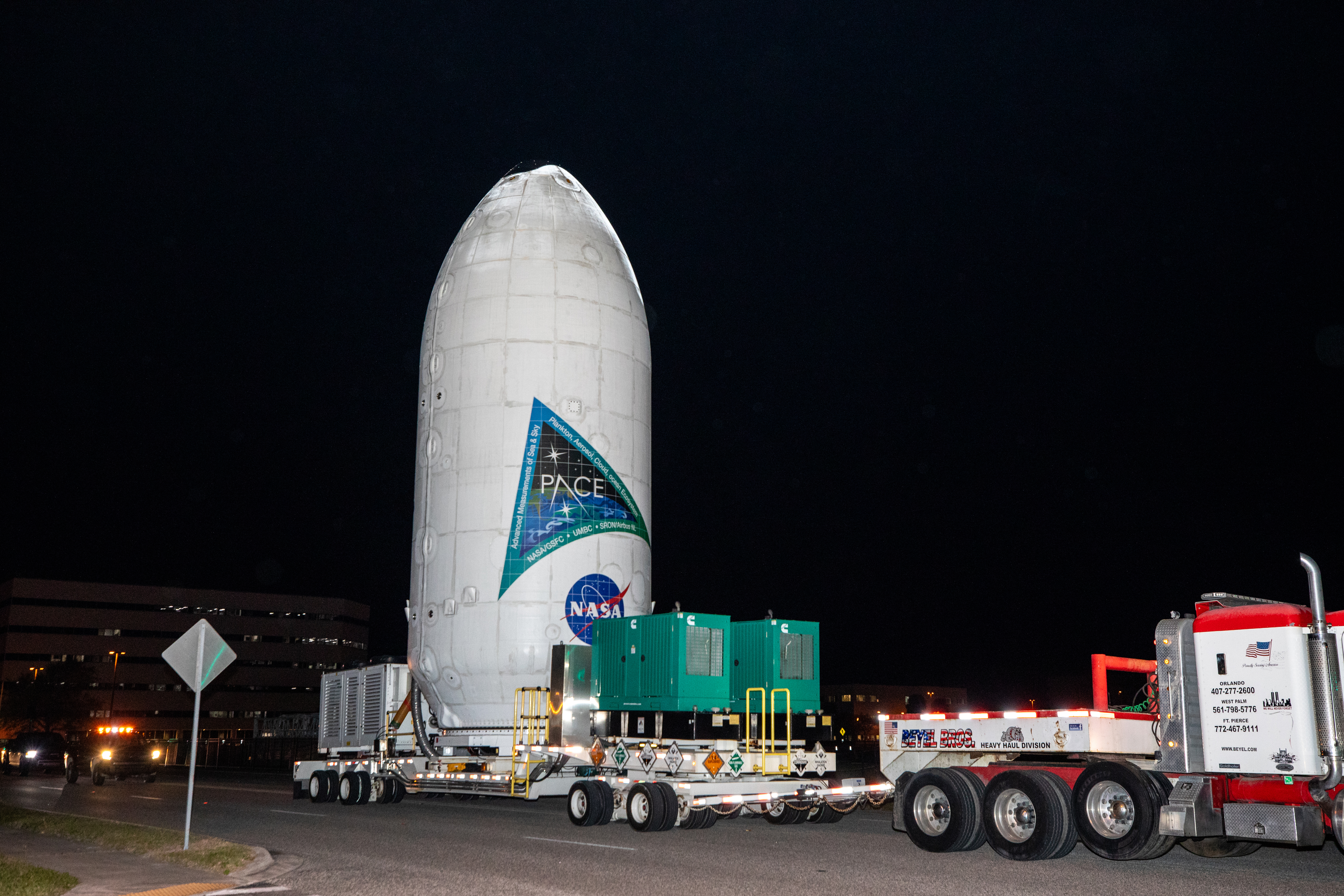
PACE spacecraft, encapsulated inside a Falcon 9 payload fairing, being transported to Space Launch Complex 40 on Thursday, 1 February 2024.

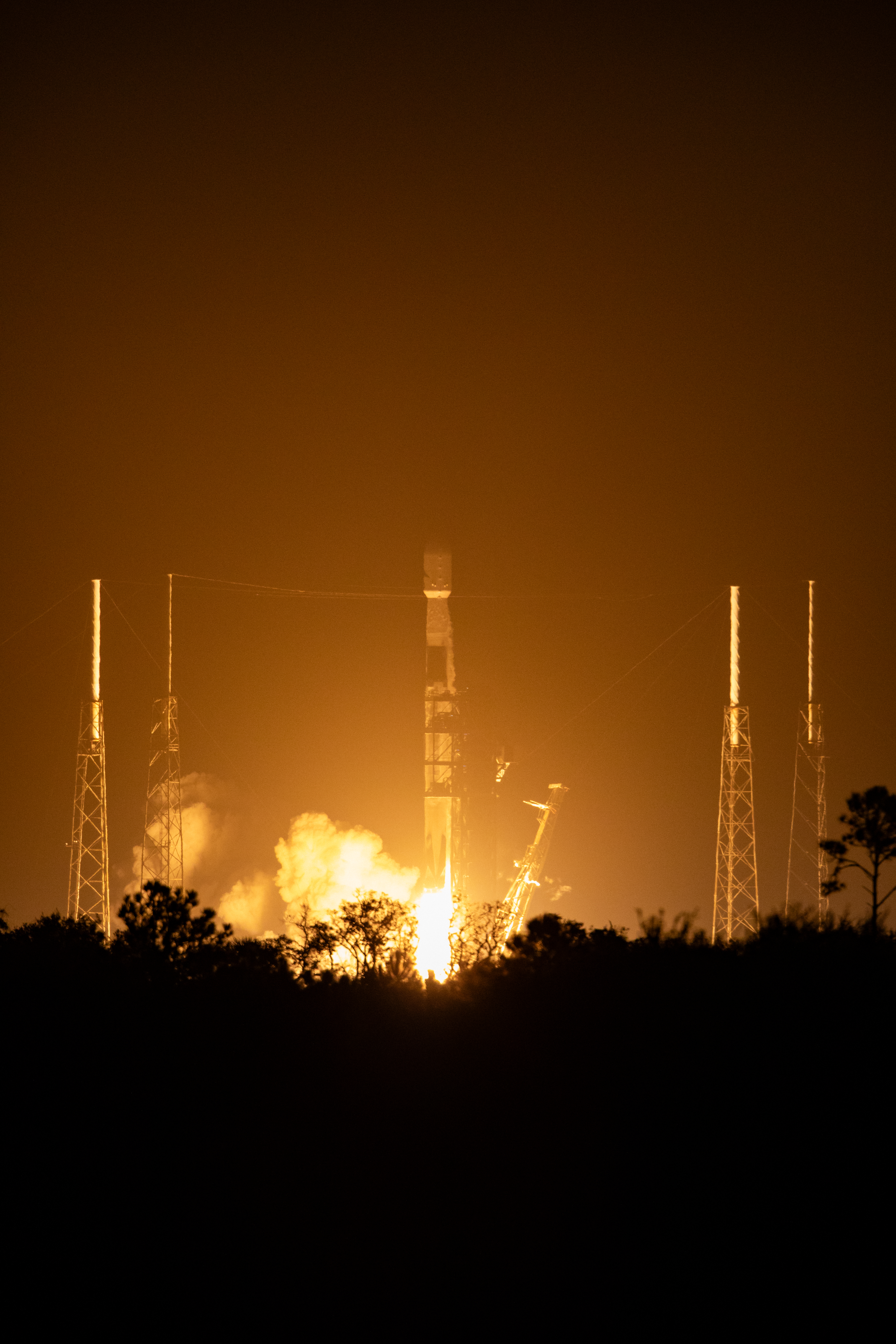
Launch of the PACE spacecraft aboard a Falcon 9 rocket

PACE was launched on 8 February 2024, at 06:33 UTC instantaneous launch window, on a SpaceX Falcon 9 rocket from Cape Canaveral Space Launch Complex 40, after two days of delays caused by bad weather. Shortly after launch, the rocket performed a dogleg maneuver to place it in a southbound trajectory. After first stage separation, the Falcon 9 booster performed a boostback burn and returned to land on the launch site, where it will be refurbished and reused on future flights. This was the fourth flight of this particular booster, which is designated B1081. The second stage of the rocket-propelled PACE into its final orbit at an altitude of 676.5 kilometers and the spacecraft was separated about 13 minutes after launch.

Unusual for an east coast launch, this was a polar launch that placed the spacecraft into a Sun-synchronous orbit, a type of orbit commonly used on observation satellites because it allows the satellite to overfly the entire planet without changing its orbit. PACE's orbit allows the satellite to cross the equator at 1300 (+- 10 mins) local time every single orbit.These launches are usually carried out from Vandenberg Space Force Base in California, to prevent debris from landing on populated areas, but SpaceX resumed polar launches from Florida in 2020 because of its ability to land the Falcon 9 booster safely and the introduction of the Autonomous Flight Safety System on the Falcon rockets. PACE was the first US government mission to launch to a polar orbit from Florida since 1960. The choice to launch PACE from Florida was simply a matter of convenience, due to it being located closer to the Goddard Space Flight Center, where the mission is operated.

The cost of the launch was $80.4 million. After launch PACE entered a 60-day commissioning period before publication of data.

== See also ==
- NASA Earth Science
- Earth Observing System
- List of NASA Large Strategic Science Missions
