= Dogleg maneuver =

Maneuver in spaceflight

Dogleg maneuver means altering the trajectory of a satellite's launch by a sharp turn or a bend in order to avoid collisions or to avoid falling of debris in overpopulated areas.

Polar satellites launched using PSLV rockets from Sriharikota, India, using a dogleg maneuver to avoid debris falling over Sri Lanka. The picture shows the route of the satellite Cartosat-2F.

Polar satellites launched using Sriharikota spaceport of South India frequently use this maneuver to avoid flying over Sri Lanka. Rockets make a steep 40° arc in order to bypass the city of Colombo. For larger satellites, the fuel required for the maneuver is insignificant compared to the total fuel. However, the launch corridor is inefficient for smaller rockets carrying payloads to a polar orbit because the weight of extra fuel eats into the weight of payload possible. Small rockets, such as the SSLV, are specifically designed to efficiently launch smaller payloads. The additional fuel consumption for the curved trajectory compromises the rocket's cost and payload efficiency. To avoid this problem, ISRO is developing a new Kulasekharapatnam Spaceport for launching payloads to polar orbits. Given its location, launches from Kulasekharapatnam can be launched directly south over the Indian Ocean without crossing any landmass for thousands of miles.

The STS-36 mission of Space shuttle Atlantis was launched from Kennedy Space Center instead of Vandenberg Air Force Base. Due to this, the Shuttle performed a dogleg maneuver to change the trajectory by 5° in order to reach the desired orbit.

Galactic Radiation and Background (GRAB) was a series of five Naval Research Laboratory electronic surveillance and solar astronomy satellites, launched from 1960 to 1962. During the second launch attempt, the Thor booster shut down 12 seconds early, and the flight was subsequently terminated by Range safety. As fragments fell on Cuba, subsequent launches from Cape Canaveral flew a dogleg trajectory to reach 70-degree inclination.

== See also ==
- Kulasekarapattinam Spaceport
- Satish Dhawan Space Centre
- Thumba Equatorial Rocket Launching Station
