= Kulasekarapattinam =

Town in Tamil Nadu, India

Kulasekarapattinam Kulasekharapatnam, Kulasekarapatnam, Kulasai
- Town
- Location in Tamil Nadu, India Kulasekarapattinam (India)
- Coordinates: 8°24′0″N 78°3′0″E
- Country: India
- State: Tamil Nadu
- District: Thoothukudi

Area
  - Total: 12.5 km^{2} (4.8 sq mi)

Population (2001)
  - Total: 12,010
  - Density: 961/km^{2} (2,490/sq mi)

Languages
  - Official: Tamil
- Time zone: UTC+5:30 (IST)
- PIN: 628206
- Telephone code: 4639
- Vehicle registration: TN 92
- Nearest city: Thoothukudi
- Sex ratio: 1000:1177 ♂/♀
- Literacy: 85.91%
- Lok Sabha constituency: Thoothukudi; Formerly with Tiruchendur
- Vidhan Sabha constituency: Tiruchendur
- Civic agency: Kulasekharapatnam Panchayat Board
- Climate: Humid (Köppen)
- Website: www.kulasaikukieaks.com

Kulasekarapattinam (also spelled Kulasekharapatnam and Kulasekarapatnam) is a town in the Thoothukudi district of Tamil Nadu, India. Historically, it was an important port on the Coromandel Coast, alongside Kaveripumpattinam (Poompuhar) and Arikamedu (near Pondicherry). It houses the currently under-construction SSLV Launch Complex, one of the two satellite launch centres in India (the other being Satish Dhawan Space Centre, Sriharikota). After the construction work is completed, ISRO and private aerospace companies will launch satellites using multistage rockets such as the SSLV from Kulasekarapattinam.

From at least the 1st century CE, Kulasekarapatnam functioned as a trading hub for Pandya Dynasty. While Kollam served as a major port on the west coast, Kulasekarapatnam connected the Pandyas to Ceylon and the pearl fisheries of the Gulf of Mannar. It was part of a network of ancient coastal settlements that included Kodungallur in Kerala and Barugachha (Broach) in Gujarat.

During the colonial era, as Tuticorin emerged as a dominant port, the prominence of Kulasekarapatnam declined.

The town's name is derived from the Pandyan ruler Maravarman Kulasekara Pandyan I.

Kulasekarapatnam is home to the 300-year-old Mutharamman Temple and the Dharmasamvardhini Temple, which lies north of the village. The town is particularly known for its Dussehra celebrations.

During British rule, a sugar factory operated in the town. The British also introduced the Kulasekarapatnam Light Railway, which, as of 1933, had stations including Kulasekarapatnam Central, Kulasekarapatnam Port, and KPM Sugar Factory.

ISRO is developing a spaceport at Kulasekarapattinam, positioning it as a key location for India's space missions.

== History ==
During the reign of the Pandyas, Kulasekharapatnam was also known as the Rowthers Palayam, a section of Muslims that had military cavalry, followed traditional customs, and were horse traders. Kulasekharapatnam was an important trade center before the arrival of Islam. The current Muslim population of Kulasekharapatnam is known as the Marakkar or Marakkayars, who engaged in maritime trade. They had come from Kerala, and it is said that Kunjali Marakkar's family members came from Kerala. Typical of most port towns, Kulasekharapatnam has a lighthouse, located near Manapad. The city has been inhabited by Hindus since the 8th century CE.

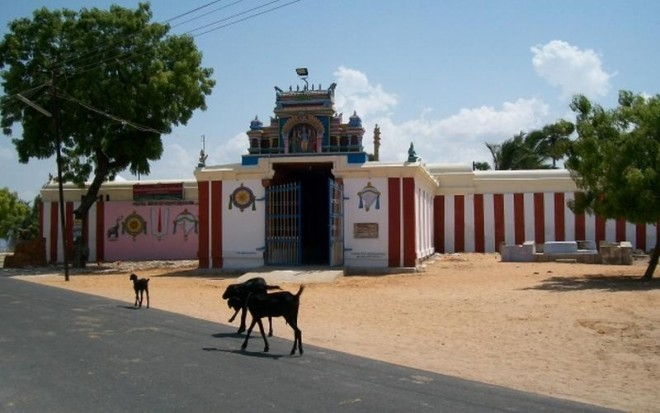
Kulasekarapatnam Perumal Temple

=== Origin of Marakkars ===
Marakkar are distinctive Tamil and Malayalam-speaking Muslim people of the states of Tamil Nadu and Kerala in India. The name Marakkar is different from Marakkayar (Marikkar & Maricar are other spellings used in history books). According to numerous historians, Moppila or Moplah is Maha Pillai (great son) and Marakkar means (Marakkalam is a wooden boat) 'boatmen'. Thurston, in his work 'Tribes of South India', states the following - The word Marakkar is usually derived from the Tamil marakalam, meaning 'boat'.

It was also a titular name for maritime traders. Marakkar was a prized title given by the Zamorin of Calicut. Derived from Marakka Rayar, it signifies the captain of a ship ('Rayar' meaning 'king' or, here, 'captain' and 'Marakkalam' meaning 'ship'). They are also called marakala rayars, from marakalam ('wooden boat') and rayar ('king') in the Tamil language. The captains of the vessels are called malimars, coming from the Tamil words malumi ('captain') and yar, and crew members are called sherangs.

Traditionally, the Marakkars engaged in mercantile commerce. They are primarily located along the coasts of the southernmost states of Kerala and Tamil Nadu in India.

The Marakala, also known as the Mogela or Mogaveera, community is an influential fishing community in coastal Karnataka. They are traditionally fishermen, and their caste profession is fishing in rivers and the sea. The Barkoor Bennekudru Kulamahasthry temple, Uchila Mahalaxmi temple, and Bagvadi Mahishamardini temples are major Mogaveera kuladevata (relating to ancestral tutelary deities) temples in coastal Karnataka.

== Old Harbour mentioned by Marco Polo ==
Marco Polo describes the Pandyan port city of Kulasekharapatnam as a place where an abundance of business was done as ships from Hormos, Kis, Aden and Arabia traveled there to trade horses and other goods. This trade attracted large crowds from surrounding regions, establishing the city as a trading center. Pillars that were used to give direction to ships are still visible in the seashore of Kulasekharapatnam.

== See also ==
- ISRO
- Sriharikota
