= SSLV Launch Complex =

Under-development spaceport in India

- Interactive map of SSLV Launch Complex
- Location: Kulasekarapattinam, Thoothukudi district, Tamil Nadu, India
- Coordinates: 8.36123°N 78.01572°E
- Short name: SLC
- Operator: ISRO
- Launch pad: One

SSLV Launch Pad launch history
- Status: Under construction
- Associated rockets: SSLV; Vikram; Agnibaan

SSLV Launch Complex (SLC) is the second spaceport of ISRO, located in Kulasekarapattinam, a coastal village in Thoothukudi district of Tamil Nadu, India. The facility is being constructed over 9.5 square kilometres (3.7 sq mi).

== History ==
In 2011, a requirement for a new launch facility other than the Satish Dhawan Space Centre (SDSC) was expressed to meet future demands and as a redundancy for the existing facilities. Following this, in 2013, Kulasekarapattinam was proposed as a potential site for this launch facility by parliamentarians from the state of Tamil Nadu, citing advantages such as location, weather and proximity to ISRO facilities like the ISRO Propulsion Complex and Liquid Propulsion Systems Centre.

However, due to programmatic delays, the Third Launch Pad project was deprioritized as requirements to establish a new launch facility were not being met and existing facilities were augmented instead.

After the ISRO began pursuing the Small Satellite launch Vehicle (SSLV) project in 2017, the old proposal of Kulasekarapattinam launch site became relevant again. After considering another site on the western coast near the state of Gujarat, Kulasekarapattinam was eventually selected as the site for the SSLV Launch Complex. A site survey began in May 2019 and around 2,500 acres of land were identified for acquisition. The land acquisition process for the launch facility began in November 2019.

On 28 February 2024, the foundation stone was laid for the construction of the new facility, with an area of 2,233 acres in the Padukkapathu, Pallakurichi, and Mathavankurichi villages in the Kulasekarapattinam and Sathankulam taluks of the Thoothukudi district. The state government of Tamil Nadu completed the land acquisition for project which will be built at an estimated cost of ₹950 crore (US$99 million) and aiming for readiness by 2026.

To mark the occasion, ISRO launched a RH-200 Rohini Sounding Rocket from the launch complex at 13:40 (IST) on 28 February 2024. This was the first rocket launch from the spaceport. The Vikram Sarabhai Space Centre (VSSC) provided the rocket and the meteorological payload, while SDSC installed launch facilities including radars, launchers, and electronic systems.

In January 2025, the new ISRO chairman V. Narayanan announced that the new facility will be ready for launch within two years. The construction of the launch facilities were officially started from 5 March 2025. ISRO aims to complete the project by December 2026. The construction work of SSLV Launch Pad is going on in full swing, with the foundation stone laid by ISRO chairman V. Narayanan on 27 August 2025. It is estimated that this facility will cater 20 to 25 launches every year. ISRO plans to commission the launch pad by August 2026, with the first launch from the site by December 2026.

In October 2026, ISRO chairman V. Narayanan told the media that the first launch from the complex is expected in March or April 2027.

== Location ==
ISRO has operated the SDSC in Sriharikota as its primary launch site since 1971. Its location on the Bay of Bengal provides a good launch azimuth corridor and ensures safety through rockets launched over the ocean. However, the launch corridor is inefficient for smaller rockets carrying payloads to a polar orbit (circling the Earth above the poles), since the island nation of Sri Lanka is directly to the South of Sriharikota. To avoid the risk of flying over another country, payloads for polar orbits are launched towards the East and follow a curved path to the South to avoid Sri Lanka's landmass. This maneuver is known as a dogleg maneuver.

Depiction of the Dogleg maneuver, which is inefficient for smaller rockets such as the SSLV. This problem will be resolved by launching rockets from the new Spaceport, bypassing the Sri Lankan landmass in its entirety.

The dogleg maneuver utilizes significant amounts of fuel in smaller rockets. Small rockets, such as the SSLV, are specifically designed to efficiently launch smaller payloads. The additional fuel consumption for the curved trajectory compromises the rocket's cost and payload efficiency. To avoid this problem, ISRO is developing the SSLV Launch Complex for launching payloads to polar orbits. Given its location, launches from Kulasekarapattinam can be launched directly south over the Indian Ocean without crossing any landmass for thousands of miles.

== Facilities ==
This spaceport will provide launchpads and support facilities for ISRO missions carrying payloads into polar orbits. Few of the main facilities of SLC are:

- SSLV Assembly Facility (SAF): SAF will be a multi-storied building for the vertical assembly of SSLV rocket.
- Satellite Preparation Facility (SPF): SPF will facilitate the satellite preparation activities for the launch. It will be equipped to receive the satellites, de-containerization, preparation, propellant loading, encapsulation of satellite before transfer to SAF.
- Nozzle Assembly and Stage Preparation Facility (NASPF): The facility will be used for SSLV first stage (SS1) preparation like assemble the nozzle with nozzle end segment, and to prepare other segments for vertical assembly.
- Non Destructive Testing Facility (NDT): NDT will be equipped to non-destructively inspect solid motors, segments, igniters of SSLV for any anomalies through radiography.
- Upper Stage Assembly Facility 1 and 2: UAF-1 will prepare the second stage (SS2) and UAF-2 will prepare the third stage (SS3) of SSLV for assembly operations. Both stage preparation facilities will work in parallel.
- Segment Storage and Magazine (SSM): For storage of SSLV solid stages. SS1 is stored vertically while SS2 and SS3 motors are stored horizontally.
- Launch Control Centre / Mission Control Centre (LCC/MCC): Launch related activities of SSLV will be controlled from LCC and MCC. The building will include a VIP launch view gallery.
- Technical Service Building (TSB), Base Fire Station (BFS), Ground Level Reservoir (GLR): The Technical Service Building will have provisions to accommodate the senior executives, engineers and conference hall, etc., to meets the SLC technical requirements. The Base Fire Station will monitor the fire alarms and FDA system in SLC, and will be equipped with fire tenderer, extinguishers and fire suppression systems for fire emergency. The Ground Level Reservoir will supply water to fire hydrant systems of technical facilities. The GLR includes 500 and 400 cubic meter reservoirs with pump rooms and hydrant lines connecting the facilities.
- Radar Building 1, 2 and 3, Telemetry and Telecommand: Radars are used to track the launch vehicle for range safety. For SLC, three identical radar facilities are planned.
- Material Handling (MAHAN) and Balloon Shed: For material storage and weather balloons.

== List of launches ==
This section provides a list summary of the launches taken place in SSLV Launch Complex. It is one of the two satellite launch centre for ISRO. It is located in Kulasekarapattinam, a coastal village in Thoothukudi district of Tamil Nadu, India.

=== Launch statistics ===
==== Orbital vehicles ====
- SSLV: 0 (0 successful, 0 partial success, 0 failure)

=== List of launches by pad ===
==== SSLV Launch Pad ====
#	Launch date	Launch vehicle	Version / Serial	Result	Notes
1	TBA	SSLV	TBA		
2	TBA	TBA	TBA		
3	TBA	TBA	TBA		
4	TBA	TBA	TBA		

=== Planned launches ===
Launch date	Launch pad	Launch Vehicle	Version/ Serial	Payload
TBA	SSLV Launch Complex	SSLV	TBA	TBA
TBA	SSLV Launch Complex	TBA	TBA	TBA
TBA	SSLV Launch Complex	TBA	TBA	TBA
TBA	SSLV Launch Complex	TBA	TBA	TBA
TBA	SSLV Launch Complex	TBA	TBA	TBA

== See also ==
- Satish Dhawan Space Centre
- Vikram Sarabhai Space Centre
- Thumba Equatorial Rocket Launching Station
- List of SSLV Launch Complex launches
