= Transatmospheric orbit =

Movement around a celestial body that remains below its Karman line

A transatmospheric orbit (TAO) is an orbit around a celestial body in which a portion of the orbit intersects with the defined atmosphere. Transatmospheric Earth orbits generally use the FAI defined Kármán line of 100 km (62 mi) altitude to differentiate between transatmospheric Earth orbits or low Earth orbits but altitudes such as the U.S. defined 50 mi (80 km) line may be used. Such orbits are subject to significant atmospheric drag, causing rapid orbital decay if left unchecked.

A number of artificial satellites have been placed into transatmospheric Earth orbits, usually due to a launch vehicle malfunction. Such satellites include EOS 02 and AzaadiSAT, which were deployed into a 76 km × 356 km (47 mi × 221 mi) transatmospheric orbit due to an upper-stage malfunction on the SSLV rocket. Transatmospheric orbits have limited practical applications because objects placed into such orbits are subject to rapid orbital decay. One such application was used to test the reentry of the IXV spaceplane. It was launched into a 76 km × 416 km (47 mi × 258 mi) transatmospheric orbit.

The Boeing Starliner spacecraft was placed in a transatmospheric orbit by the Atlas V launcher. It used its onboard propulsion to reach the International Space Station in LEO.

Astrobotic Technology's Peregrine lunar lander was moved to a transatmospheric orbit following a fuel leak to avoid becoming hazardous space debris.

SpaceX's Starship has used transatmospheric orbital trajectory for its test flights to ensure a controlled impact area and no long-term space debris in case of an in-orbit anomaly.

== See also ==
- Abort once around, a Space Shuttle abort mode requiring an incomplete orbit with a path somewhat resembling TAO
- Sub-orbital spaceflight
