= SSLV-D2 =

Second launch of the Indian Small Satellite Launch Vehicle

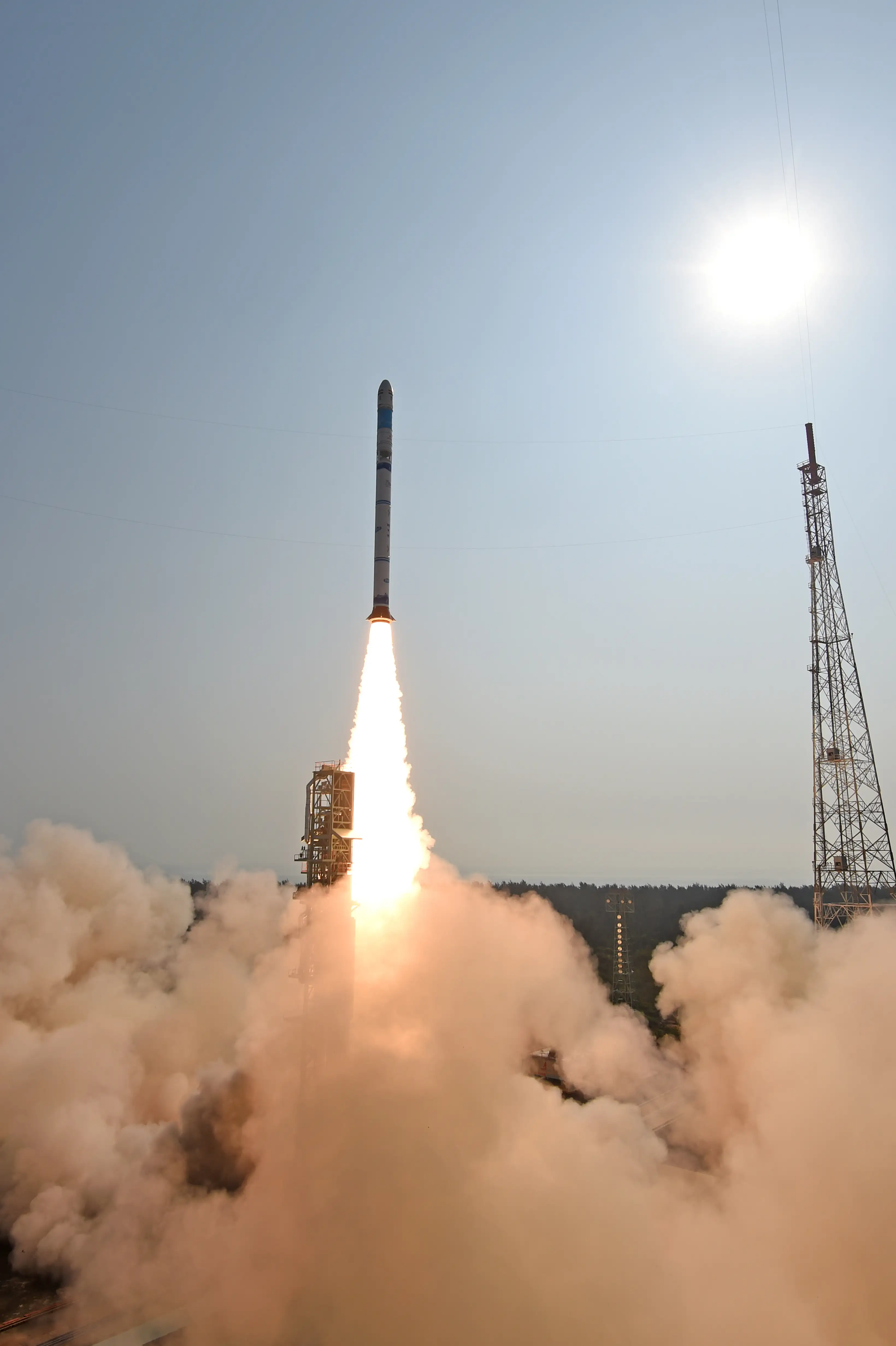
- SSLV-D2 launch

SSLV launch
- Launch: 10 February 2023 at 03:48 ( UTC )
- Operator: ISRO
- Pad: Satish Dhawan Space Centre
- Payload: (India) EOS–07 (United States) Janus 01 (India) AzaadiSAT-2
- Outcome: Successful

SSLV launches

The SSLV-D2 was the second mission of the Small Satellite Launch Vehicle (SSLV). The vehicle carried three payloads: EOS–07, Antaris US Firm named as Janus-01 and AzaadiSAT-2 by SpaceKidz India.

== Details ==
ISRO launched the Small Satellite Launch Vehicle (SSLV) in Low Earth orbit, on 10 February 2023 from the first launchpad of Satish Dhawan Space Centre in Sriharikota. It contained three payloads having a total mass of 172.6 kg.

This was the follow-up mission of SSLV-D1 with main objectives to demonstrate in-flight performance of SSLV vehicle systems and injection of all three satellites into 450 km low Earth orbit.

== Mission statistics ==
- Mass:
  - Total liftoff weight: 119,000 kilograms (262,000 lb)
  - Payload weight: 172.6 kilograms (381 lb)
- Overall height: 34 metres (111.5 ft)
- Propellant:
  - Stage 1: Solid HTPB based
  - Stage 2: Solid HTPB based
  - Stage 3: Solid HTPB based
  - Stage 4 (VTM): Liquid MMH + MON-3
- Altitude: 450 kilometres (280 mi)
- Inclination: 37.2°
- Period: 923.6 seconds
- Launch azimuth: 135°

== Launch ==
The second SSLV development launch was carried out on 10 February 2023 from the first launchpad of Satish Dhawan Space Centre in Sriharikota.
