= EOS-08 =

2024 Indian earth-observation satellite

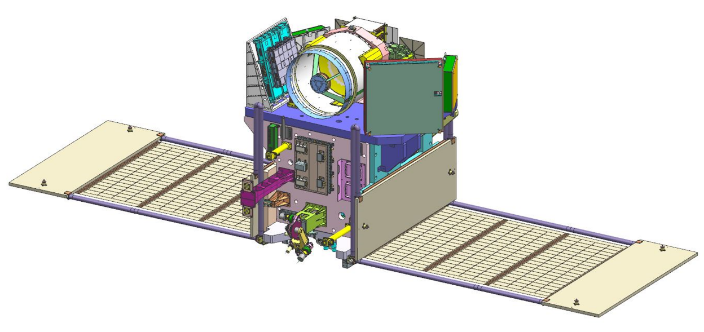
- Rendering of EOS-08 in deployed configuration
- Names: Microsat - 2C
- Mission type: Earth Observation
- Operator: ISRO
- COSPAR ID: 2024-147A
- SATCAT no.: 60454
- Website: ISRO SSLV-D3 / EOS-08 Mission
- Mission duration: expected – 1 year elasped – 1 year, 9 months, 7 days

Spacecraft properties
- Spacecraft type: Earth observation satellite
- Bus: IMS-1
- Manufacturer: VSSC, ISRO
- Launch mass: 175.5 kg
- Power: 420W

Start of mission
- Launch date: 16 August 2024, 03:47 IST
- Rocket: SSLV-D3
- Launch site: Satish Dhawan Space Center, First Launch Pad (FLP)
- Contractor: ISRO

Orbital parameters
- Regime: Low-Earth Orbit (LEO)
- Altitude: 475 kilometer
- Inclination: 37.4°

Instruments
- Electro Optical Infrared Payload (EOIR); Global Navigation Satellite System- Reflectometry payload (GNSS-R); SiC UV Dosimeter

EOS-08 is an experimental earth-observation Indian satellite launched on 16 August 2024.

== Payloads ==
The satellite carries three payloads namely Electro Optical Infrared Payload (EOIR), SAC, Global Navigation Satellite System- Reflectometry payload (GNSS-R), SAC and SiC UV Dosimeter, LEOS.

- EOIR payload is to image in Mid-Wave IR (MIR) band and in Long Wave IR (LWIR) band during day and night for various applications like Satellite based surveillance, Disaster Monitoring, Environmental Monitoring, Fire Detection, Volcanic activities and Industrial and power plant disaster.
- GNSS-R payload is to demonstrate the capability using GNSS-R based remote sensing to derive applications like Ocean Surface Winds, Soil moisture, Cryosphere applications over Himalayan Region, Flood detection, In-land waterbody detection etc.
- SiC UV Dosimeter is to monitor the UV irradiance in orbit and to use as a high dose alarm sensor for UV radiation. It serves as a precursor test before the Gaganyaan Mission.

== History ==
The spacecraft was launched on the third and final test flight of the Small Satellite Launch Vehicle. The launch was postponed from August 15 and finally took place on August 16, 2024.

Three days after launch on August 19, the EIOR instrument sent back its first data, capturing high-resolution thermal images of pune city and of the Namibia Desert. It soon followed with an image capture over Santiago, Chile, following a pass of Landsat 9, indicating the local temperature difference over a span of 4 hours.

== See also ==
- ISRO
- SSLV
- List of Indian satellites
