= EOS 02 =

Indian Earth observation satellite

EOS-02
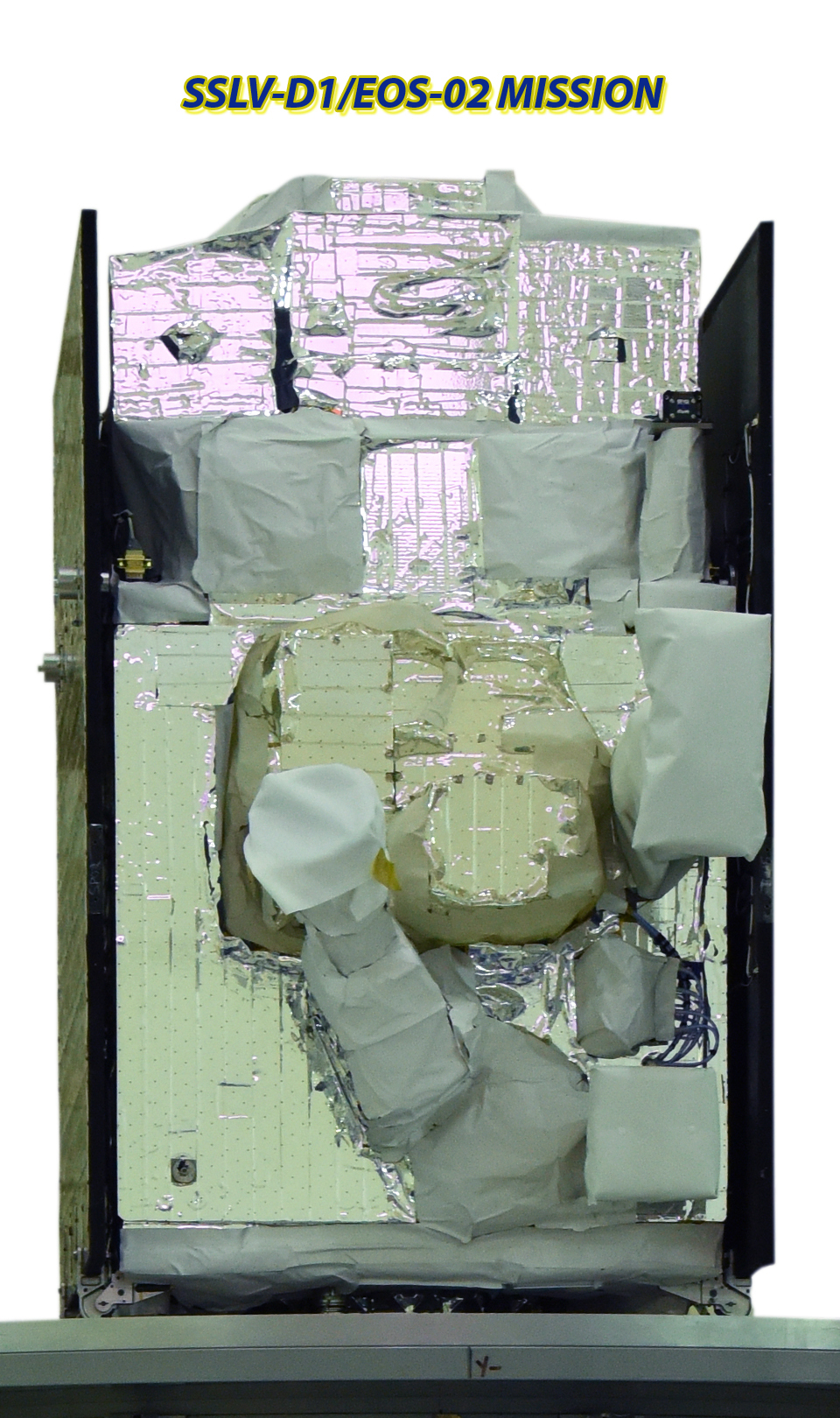
- Names: EOS-02 / Microsat-2A
- Mission type: Earth observation
- Operator: ISRO
- Website: https://www.isro.gov.in/
- Mission duration: 55 minutes
- Orbits completed: <1

Spacecraft properties
- Spacecraft: EOS-02
- Manufacturer: ISRO
- Launch mass: 135 kg

Start of mission
- Launch date: 03:48 UTC, 7 August 2022
- Rocket: Small Satellite Launch Vehicle
- Launch site: Satish Dhawan Space Centre, First launch Pad (FLP)
- Contractor: ISRO

End of mission
- Decay date: 7 August 2022 04:43 UTC

Orbital parameters
- Regime: Low Earth (intended); Transatmospheric (achieved)
- Periapsis altitude: 76 km (47 mi)
- Apoapsis altitude: 356 (221 mi)
- Inclination: 37.2

EOS-02 (formerly known as Microsat-2A) was an Indian Earth observation microsatellite developed by ISRO as a test payload on the maiden launch of the Small Satellite Launch Vehicle (SSLV). EOS-02 was based on Microsat-TD. The objective behind EOS-02 was to realize and fly an experimental imaging satellite with short turnaround time to showcase launch on demand capability.

It was intended to be used for cartographic applications at a cadastral level, urban and rural management, coastal land use and regulation, utilities mapping, development and various other GIS applications. The satellite carried two payloads: a mid-wavelength and a long-wavelength infared camera with a 6m resolution.

== Launch ==
EOS-02 was launched on Small Satellite Launch Vehicle's maiden flight SSLV-D1 at 03:48 UTC / 09:18 IST on 7 August 2022, but due to the final VTM stage failure, the rocket entered a transatmospheric orbit of 356 km × 76 km (221 mi × 47 mi) instead of the planned circular 356 km (221 mi) circular orbit. As a result, both satellites onboard (EOS-02 and AzaadiSAT) were destroyed during reentry.
