= EOS–07 =

Earth observation satellite launched by India

EOS-07
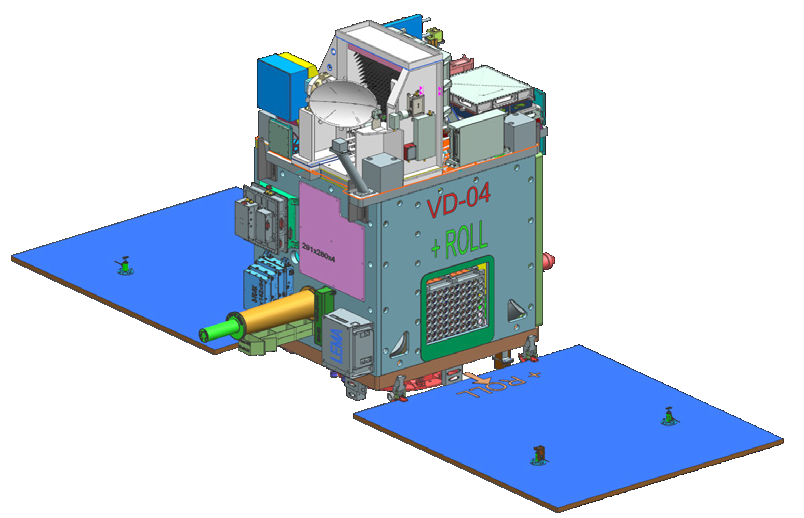
- EOS-07 satellite in deployed configuration, rendering
- Names: EOS-07 / Microsat-2B
- Mission type: Earth observation
- Operator: ISRO
- COSPAR ID: 2023-019A
- SATCAT no.: 55562
- Website: https://www.isro.gov.in/
- Mission duration: Planned: ≈1 year Final: 1 year, 10 months, 21 days

Spacecraft properties
- Spacecraft: EOS-07
- Manufacturer: ISRO
- Launch mass: 157 kg (346 lb)
- Power: 357 watts

Start of mission
- Launch date: 10 February 2023 03:48 UTC
- Rocket: Small Satellite Launch Vehicle, (SSLV-D2)
- Launch site: Satish Dhawan Space Centre, First Launch Pad (FLP)
- Contractor: ISRO
- Entered service: 10 February 2023

End of mission
- Disposal: Atmospheric entry
- Deactivated: late 2024
- Last contact: late 2024

Orbital parameters
- Reference system: Geocentric orbit
- Regime: Polar orbit
- Perigee altitude: 450 km (280 mi)
- Apogee altitude: 450 km (280 mi)
- Inclination: 37.2°
- Period: minutes

Instruments
- mmWave Humidity Sounder (MHS), Spectrum Monitoring Payload (SMP)

EOS–07 (formerly known as Microsat-2B) was an Indian Earth observation satellite developed by ISRO and launched during the SSLV-D2 mission, the first successful mission of the SSLV rocket. It's a minisatellite designed to accommodate new technology payloads in a quick turnaround time.

== Structure and Payloads ==
It has a cubical structure consisting of six Honeycomb structures. The top and Bottom decks are connected with 4 staggered cross ribs and 4 closing vertical decks. The structure includes a Starsensor (mSS), 4π Sunsensor (4πSS), a micro-Inertial Reference Unit (mIRU), and a Magnetometer. It has a passive thermal control system with Optical Solar Reflector, Multi-Layer Insulation, Thermal interface material, etc. It has 1N Thrusters (1Nms), 0.02Nm Reaction Wheels, and 20 A.m2 Magnetic Torquers powered by 5 kg of hydrazine fuel. The altitude and orbital control system (AOCS) has a pointing accuracy of – 0.1° (3σ) and a drift rate of – 7.5e-4°/s. For power generation, it has solar panels that will be deployed using Frangi bolt actuators. The panels have a power generation of 357 watts. It also has a Li-ion battery of 27.2 Ah capacity. The onboard computer has a MIL STD 1553B protocol for interfacing with other subsystems. It has a data storage capacity of 32 GB. The RF system uses S-Band Telemetry Transmitters, S-Band Telecommand Receiver, and 12-channel SPS. It has a 15m location accuracy, 0.15 m/s velocity accuracy and an X-Band Data Transmitter.

=== Payloads ===
It has two payloads; the mmWave Humidity Sounder (MHS) and a Spectrum Monitoring Payload. MHS has 6 water vapor sounding channels with 50rpm scan rate. It weighs 26 kg and requires 55 watts power. The Spectrum Monitoring Payload weighs 13 kg, requires a power~ of 35W, and has a data rate of 2 Mbit/s.

== Orbital Decay ==
During a massive Solar Storm in May 2024, EOS-07 had a higher than normal decay observed at 600 meters, as compared to 300 for regular operations. The spacecraft used its onboard engines to make up the shortfall. The spacecraft was decommissioned and underwent orbital decay in late 2024 following completion of all planned mission objectives.
