= AzaadiSAT =

Indian earth observation satellite

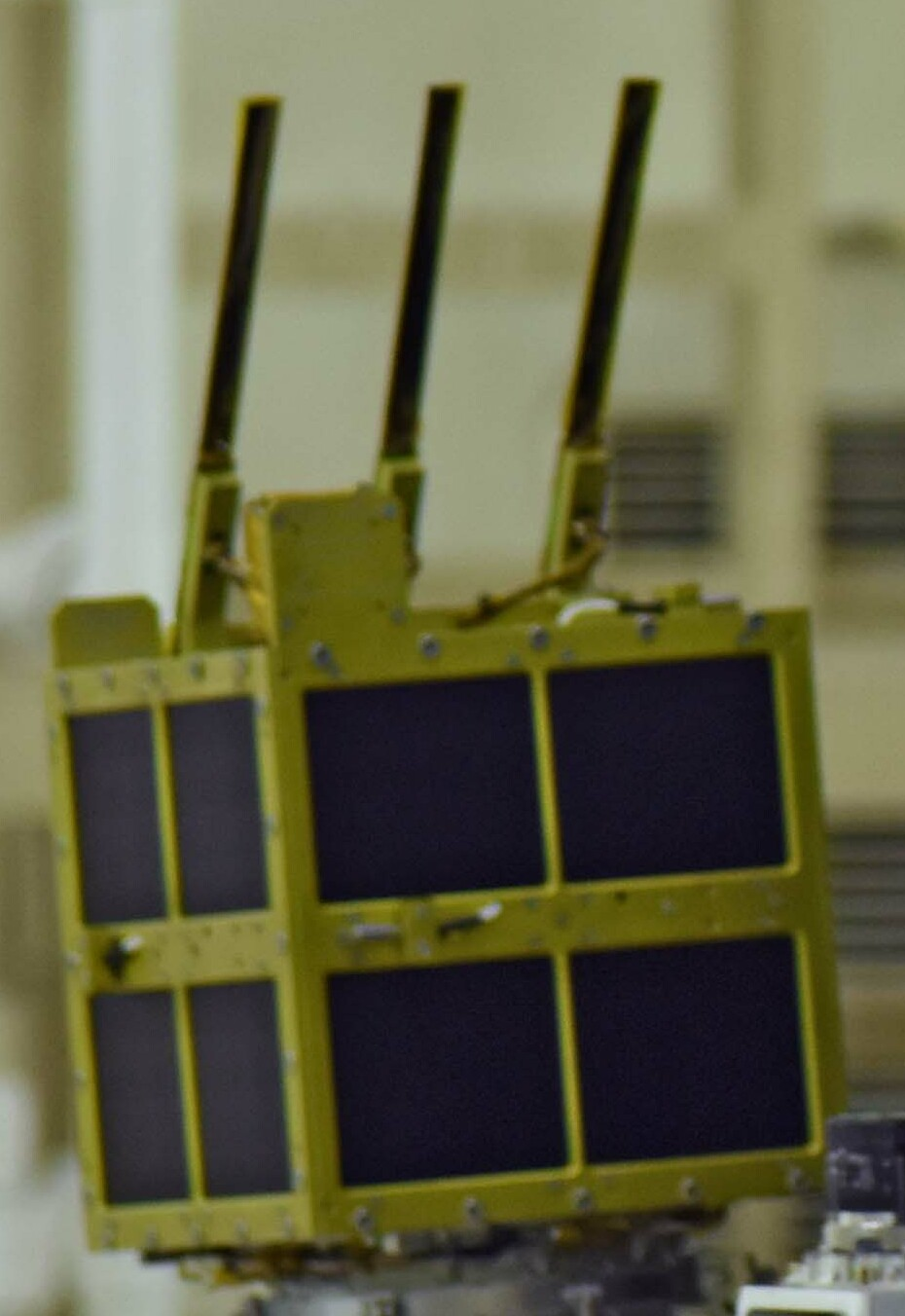
- Mission type: Earth observation
- Operator: ISRO
- Website: https://www.isro.gov.in/
- Mission duration: 55 minutes
- Orbits completed: <1

Spacecraft properties
- Spacecraft: CubeSat
- Manufacturer: Space Kidz India
- Launch mass: 8 kg

Start of mission
- Launch date: 03:48 UTC, 7 August 2022
- Rocket: Small Satellite Launch Vehicle
- Launch site: Satish Dhawan Space Centre, First launch Pad (FLP)
- Contractor: ISRO

End of mission
- Decay date: 7 August 2022 04:43 UTC

Orbital parameters
- Regime: Low Earth (intended); Transatmospheric (achieved)
- Periapsis altitude: 76 km (47 mi)
- Apoapsis altitude: 356 (221 mi)
- Inclination: 37.2

AzaadiSAT was an Indian Earth observation 8U Cubesat weighing around 8 kg. It was developed by Space Kidz India as a test payload on the maiden launch of the Small Satellite Launch Vehicle (SSLV). It was hitching a ride with EOS-02, the primary satellite of the mission. The launch on 7 August 2022 was a failure in the rocket leading to imminent return to atmosphere for the rocket and the satellites (AzaadiSAT and EOS-02) it carried, destroying them all.

Its successor AzaadiSAT-2 was launched onboard SSLV-D2.

== Development ==
The satellite was created to mark India’s 75th year of independence. This anniversary came in 2022, marked by Azadi Ka Amrit Mahotsav celebrations throughout the country. AzaadiSAT was built by schoolgirls from 75 schools across India. 10 girls from each school were involved, for a total of 750 students. The mission was created to give girls from lower-income backgrounds the opportunity to learn about spaceflight, as part of the United Nations theme of “women in space".

== Contents ==
It carried 75 payloads, each weighing around 50 grams and conducted femto-experiments. The students were provided guidance to build these payloads. The payloads were integrated by the student team of "Space Kidz India". The payloads included a UHF-VHF transponder working in ham radio frequency to enable voice and data transmission for amateur radio operators, a solid state PIN diode-based radiation counter to measure ionising radiation in its orbit, a long-range transponder and a selfie camera to take pictures of its solar panels and the Earth. The ground system developed by ‘Space Kidz India’ was to be utilised for receiving the data from this satellite.

== Launch ==
AzaadiSAT was launched on Small Satellite Launch Vehicle's maiden flight SSLV-D1 at 03:48 UTC / 09:18 IST on 7 August 2022, but failed to reach the intended orbit. Due to the final VTM stage failure, the stage as well as the two satellite payloads were injected into an unstable elliptical orbit measuring 356km x 76km and subsequently destroyed upon reentry.

== AzaadiSAT-2 ==
AzaadiSAT-2, the official successor of AzaadiSAT, was placed in a 450km circular orbit. It was launched onboard SSLV-D2. It features a modular satellite bus expansion system capable of transforming from 8U to 64U once in orbit. Other payloads remained unchanged from the original AzaadiSAT. AzaadiSAT-2 aimed to measure various health data such as temperature and reset count from 75 student experiments installed inside the satellite.
