= SSLV-D1 =

Maiden flight of the Indian SSLV rocket

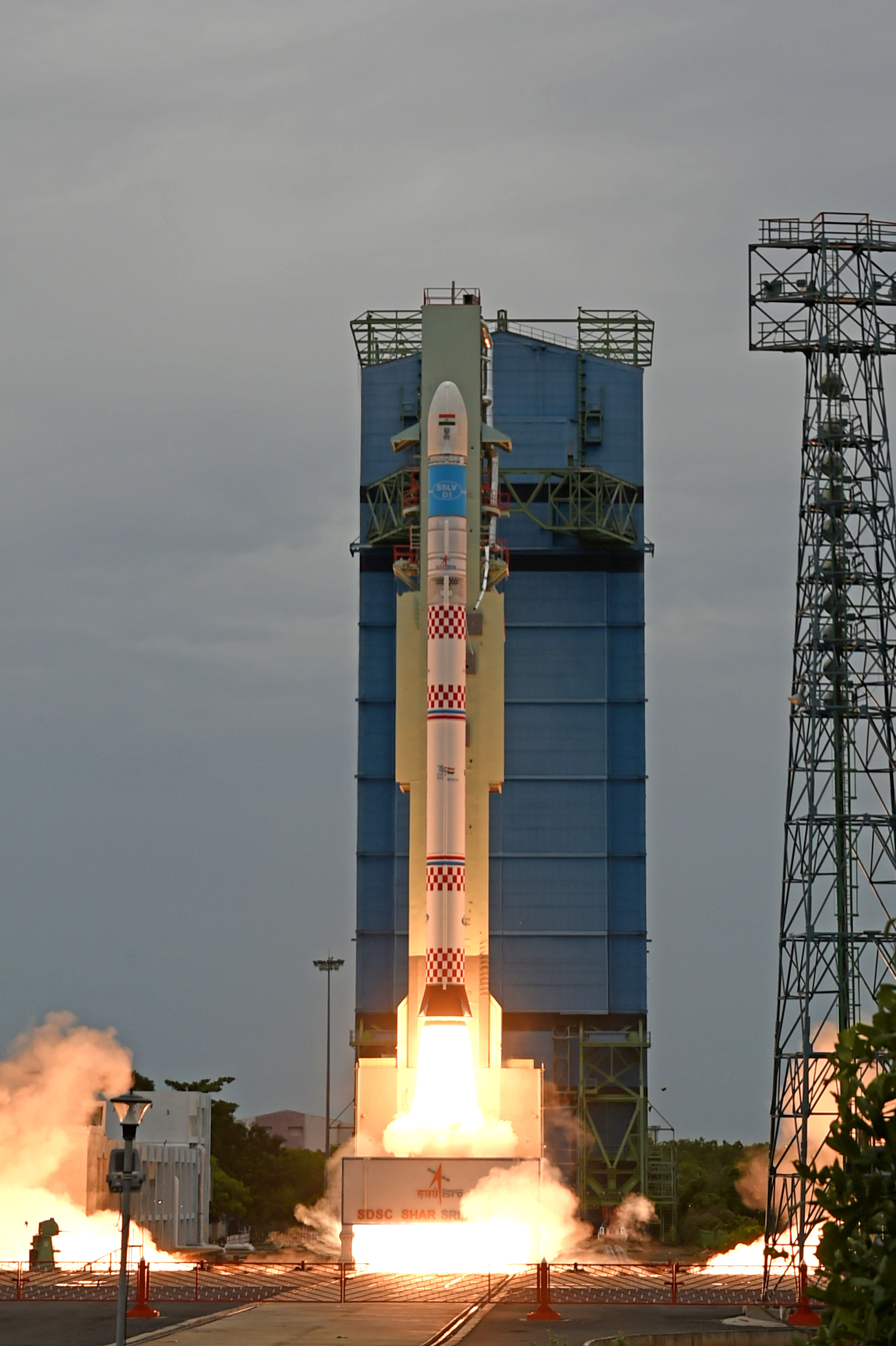
- SSLV-D1/EOS-02 launches from First Launch Pad

SSLV launch
- Launch: 7 August 2022, 03:48 (UTC)
- Pad: Satish Dhawan Space Centre
- Payload: (India) EOS 02 (India) AzaadiSAT
- Outcome: Failure

SSLV launches

The SSLV-D1 was the first mission of the Small Satellite Launch Vehicle (SSLV). Due to a sensor fault during separation of second stage and subsequent initiation of Open Loop Guidance by onboard computer to salvage the mission, the upper stage did not fire for planned duration and payloads were ultimately injected into a decaying orbit not achieving the objectives of mission.

== Details ==
ISRO developed a small satellite launch vehicle (SSLV) to cater the launch of up to 500 kg satellites to Low Earth Orbits on ‘launch-on-demand’ basis.

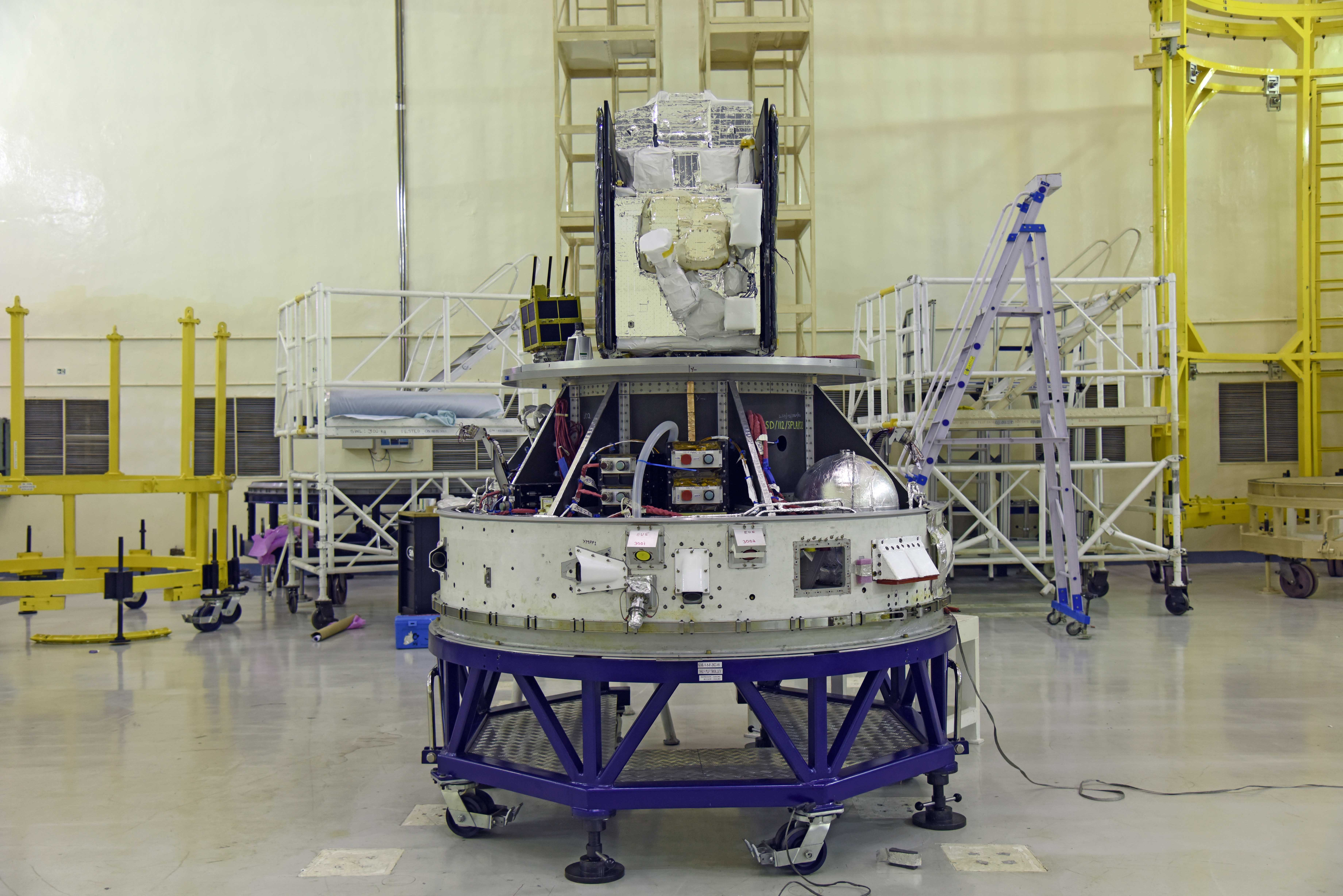
SSLV-D1, EOS-02 - EOS 02 and AzaadiSAT on Velocity Trimming Module (VTM) in cleanroom before encapsulation

SSLV-D1 mission launched EOS 02, a 135 kg satellite, with a planned Low Earth orbit of about 350 km altitude, at an inclination of about 37 degrees. EOS-02 was an Earth observation satellite designed and realised by ISRO. This microsat-type satellite offered advanced optical remote sensing operating in infrared band with high spatial resolution. The bus configuration was derived from IMS-1 bus.

The mission also carried the AzaadiSAT satellite. AzaadiSAT was a 8U Cubesat weighing around 8 kg. It carried 75 different payloads each weighing around 50 grams and conducting femto-experiments. Girl students from rural regions across the country were provided guidance to build these payloads. The payloads were integrated by the student team of “Space Kidz India”. The payloads included a UHF-VHF Transponder working in ham radio frequency to enable voice and data transmission for amateur radio operators, a solid state PIN diode-based Radiation counter to measure the ionising radiation in its orbit, a long-range transponder and a selfie camera. The ground system developed by ‘Space Kidz India’ was to be utilised for receiving the data from this satellite.

== Launch ==
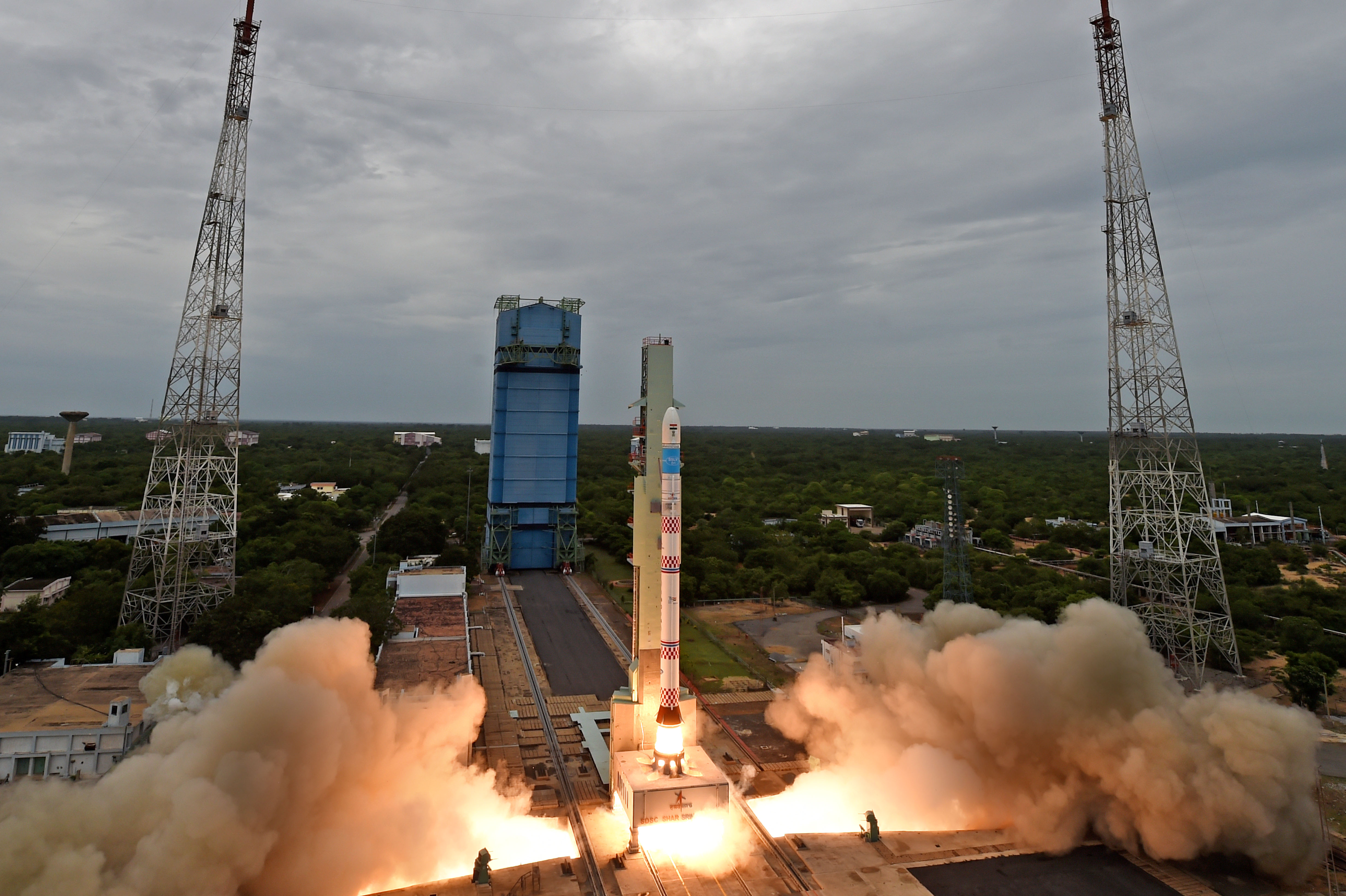
Sd12722 Launch of SSLV-D1 from Satish Dhawan FLP

SSLV launched on its maiden flight at 03:48 UTC / 09:18 IST on 7 August 2022, from the First Launch Pad, but failed to reach the intended orbit. Due to an anomaly detected with accelerometers after second stage separation the stage as well as the two satellite payloads were injected into an unstable elliptical orbit measuring 356km × 76km and subsequently destroyed upon reentry. According to the ISRO, the mission software failed to identify and correct a sensor fault and switched to Open Loop Guidance to salvage the mission. This led to the VTM stage firing only briefly (0.1s) and payloads were injected to a very low perigee.
