= Karl-Heinz Bringer =

German-born French aerospace engineer (1908–1999)

Henri Bringer
- Born: Karl-Heinz Bringer; 16 June 1908; Elstertrebnitz
- Died: 2 January 1999
- Citizenship: French
- Employer: Société européenne de propulsion
- Parents: Adolf Bringer (father); Rosa Bringer né Voigt (mother)

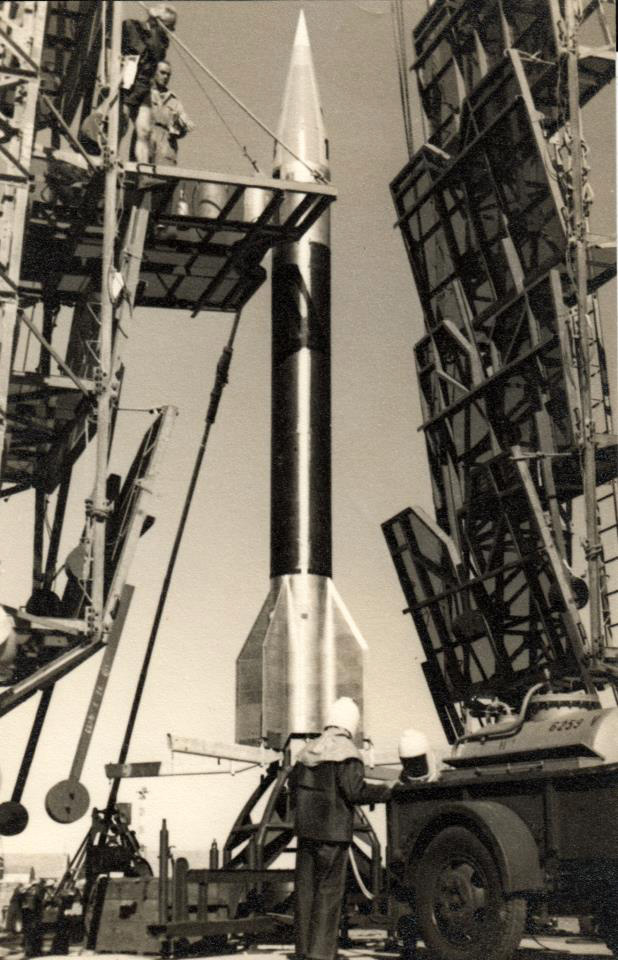
Véronique Sounding rocket.

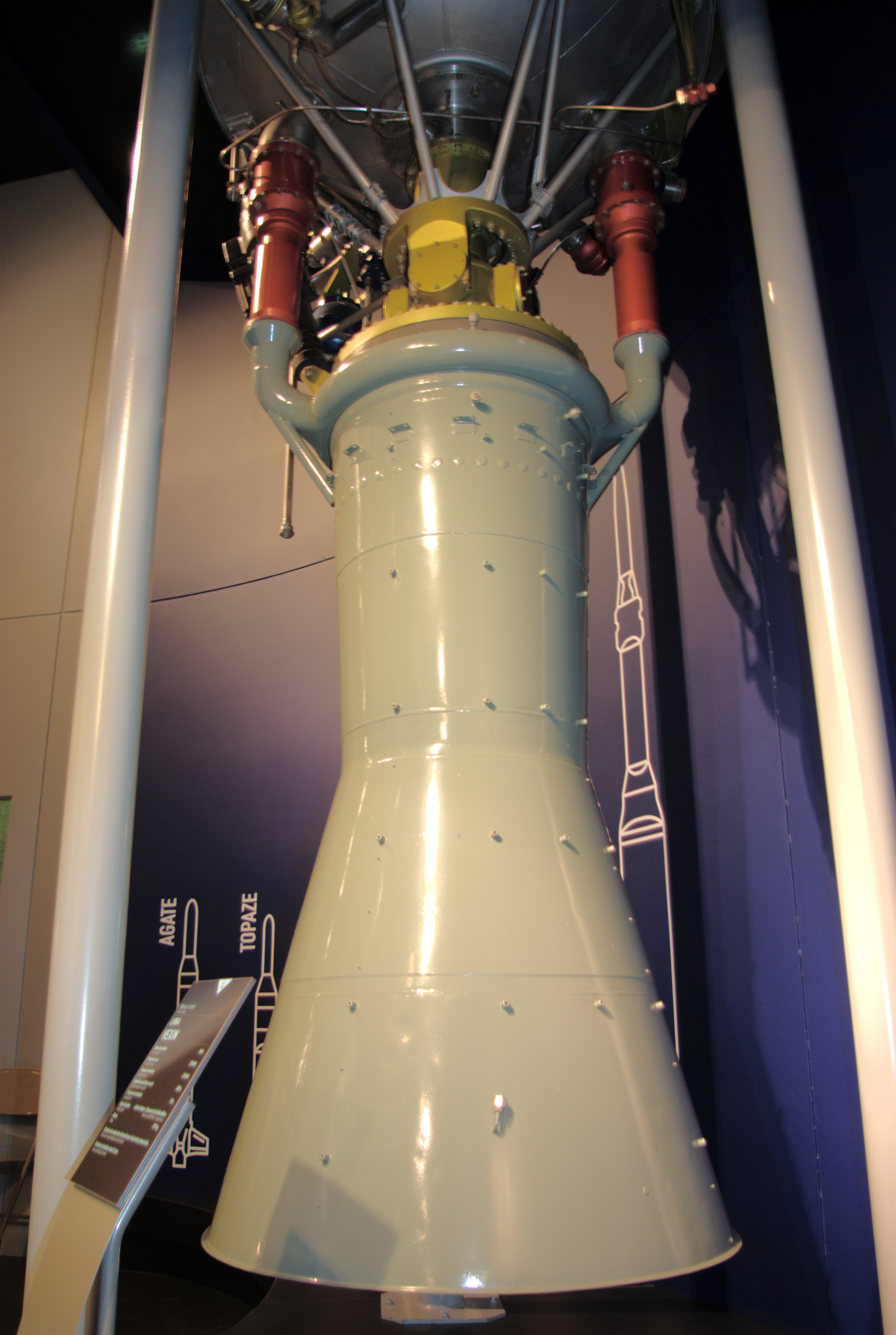
Vexin engine of Diamant A, exhibited at Safran museum.

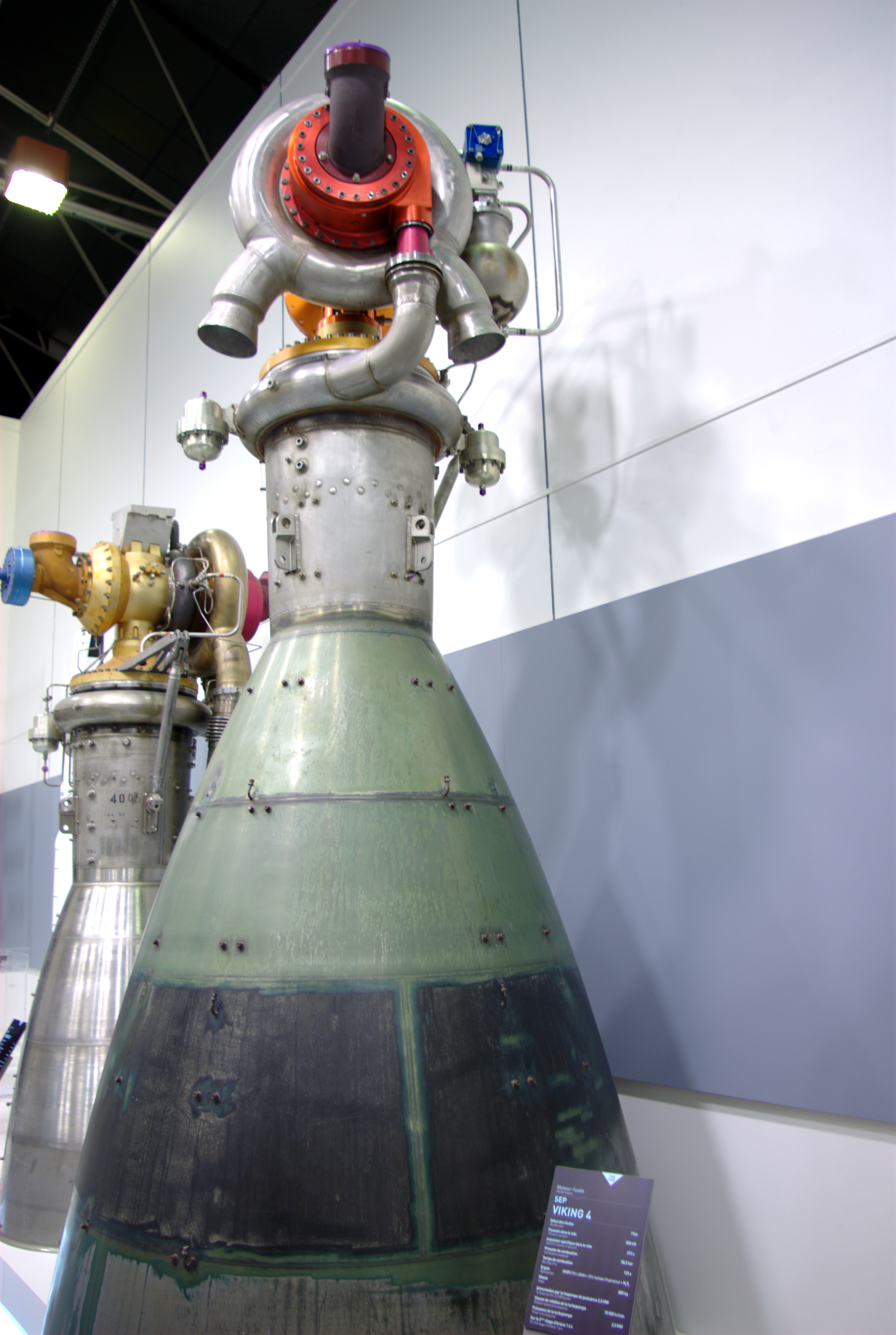
Ariane 1 rocket's Viking 4 engine, designed by Karl-Heinz Bringer, on display at the museum Safran.

Karl-Heinz Bringer (16 June 1908 – 2 January 1999) was a German aerospace engineer, and rocket propulsion specialist who later became a French citizen. Bringer worked on Nazi Germany's rocket development program at Peenemünde during World War II. After the war, he moved to France, where he worked on sounding rocket Véronique and later on Europe's Ariane rocket program.

== Biography ==
=== Germany ===
Born on 16 June 1908 in Elstertrebnitz (Kingdom of Saxony). He received elementary education in the village where he was born and from 1919 to 1927, he attended secondary school in Zeitz. After completing his secondary education, he wanted to be engineer and enrolled in Free City of Danzig (now Gdańsk, Poland). However, the bankruptcy of his father's grain business during global economic crisis forced him to abandon his studies in 1929. From 1930 to 1932 in Leipzig, he apprenticed as a locksmith during day while continuing his engineering studies in the evening after his work. After that he worked for various companies and made several inventions.

Shortly before the start of the Second World War, he was drafted into the Wehrmacht on 15 August 1939 and assigned to Poland. Later, with help from a friend, he succeeded in obtaining his transfer to the army research center in Peenemünde on 27 September 1940. Working at the engine technology department, he rose to the position of group leader for liquid propellant engines.

In 1942, he filed a patent on the concept of a gas generator, which Wernher von Braun proposed to install on the A4 missile. But due to requirements related to mass production, the design of A4 was frozen. Hence this simplified engine was retained on the heavy surface-to-air missile "Wasserfall", a reduced derivative of the V2.

After the war, he was first employed in Trauen by the UK Ministry of Supply Establishment, Cuxhaven (MOSEC) administration under English occupation. Notably he took part in Operation Backfire, during which three V2 missile launches were conducted in October 1945 at Cuxhaven.

=== France ===
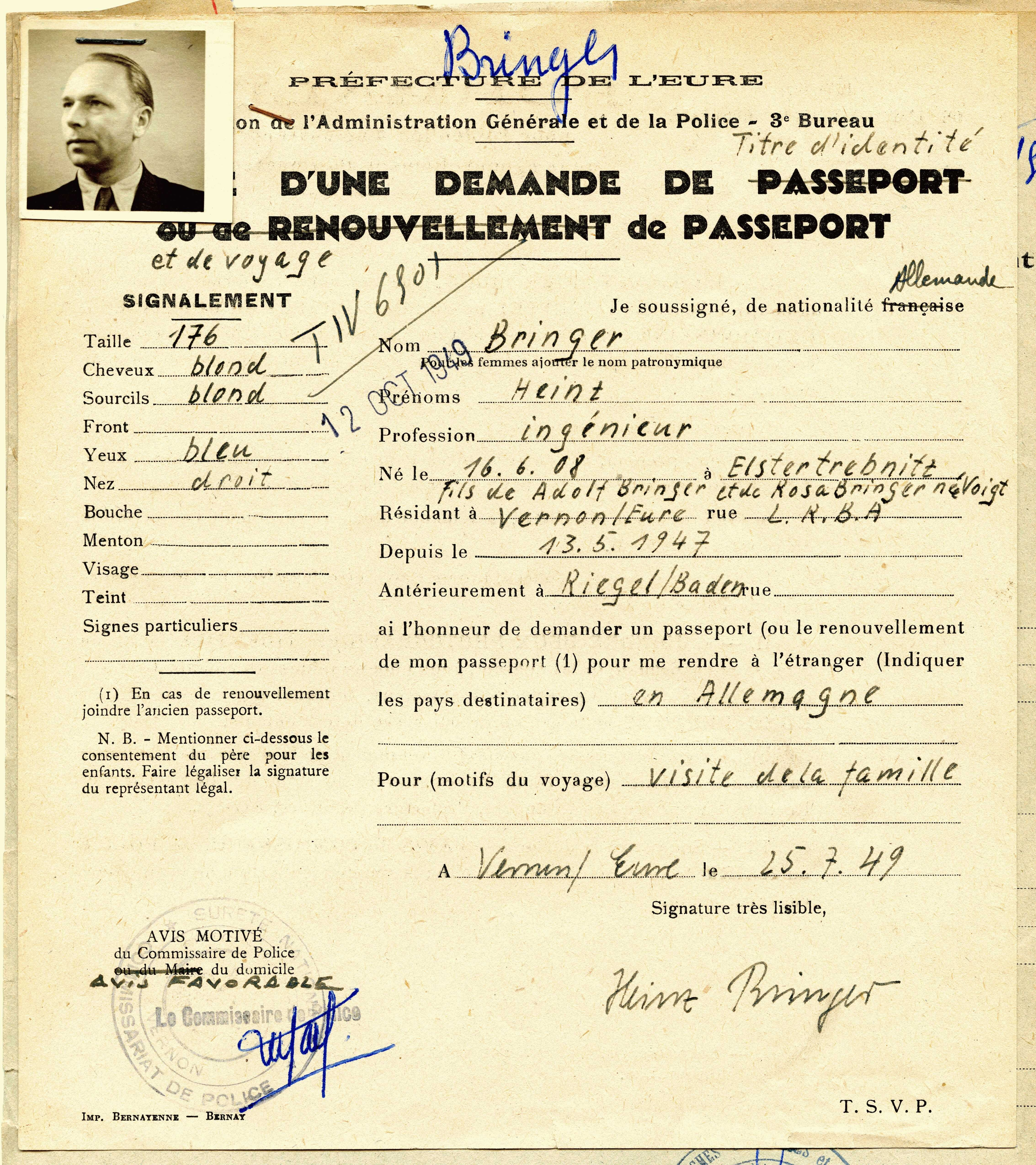
Passport application document from 1949

According to Bringer he and other German engineers accepted the job offer by French government as it was more promising and less restrictive on their movements. In 1946, a group of more than 30 engineers and other associates of Wernher von Braun signed an agreement with the French authorities to continue their work on a 40 t thrust liquid-propellant rocket in France, at the Laboratoire de Recherches ballistic and aerodynamic (LRBA). For this project, Bringer's gas generator was planned to be utilized. Bringer joined the LRBA in September 1946, first in Riegel am Kaiserstuhl, and later from May 1947 in Vernon, at a makeshift village nicknamed "Buschdorf" for German rocket engineers.

However, this 40 t thrust rocket project did not come to fruition and the French government switched to the Véronique sounding rocket which was tenth in its scale. Drawing on his experience at Peenemünde, Bringer designed an engine that burns kerosene with nitric acid. The first Véronique was successfully launched on 2 August 1950.

Bringer's engine was gradually improved upon:

- Véronique AGI (starting from 1959): also with 4 t thrust, but with turpentine instead of kerosene as fuel.
- Véronique 61 (starting from 1964): 6 t thrust
- Vesta (from 1964): 16 t thrust.
- Vexin (in Diamant A, starting from 1965): 28 t, used for the launch of the first French satellite Astérix.
- Valois (Diamant B, starting from 1970): 35 t thrust.

While working on the European launcher project Europa (rocket), Bringer and his team reconsidered the 40 t thrust engine. For this, they started development of the Viking rocket engine, which produced a thrust of 55 t on the first test firing on 8 April 1971. It has been used in various configurations of Ariane 1, 2, 3 and 4 launch vehicles.

In 1971, the civil activities, including the Viking engine, of the LRBA were transferred by the French government to the Société européenne de propulsion (SEP), which also gave Bringer a new employer. In 1973 Bringer retired but remained active until 1976 as a consultant to SEP.

The Viking engine he designed was used between 1979 and 2003 in the first and second stages of Ariane-1 to 4. As of 2024, a licensed version of this engine is still in production under the name of Vikas in India.

Bringer took the first name Henri and acquired French citizenship. For his service and inventions such as Turbopump, he received a lump sum bonus of 56,000 F from the French Ministry of Defense in 1978.

== Legacy ==
On 26 September 2010, a street bearing his name was inaugurated in Saint-Marcel.

== See also ==
- Viking (moteur-fusée)
- Ariane
- Vikas
