= Crew Module Atmospheric Re-entry Experiment =

Indian experimental space vehicle

CARE
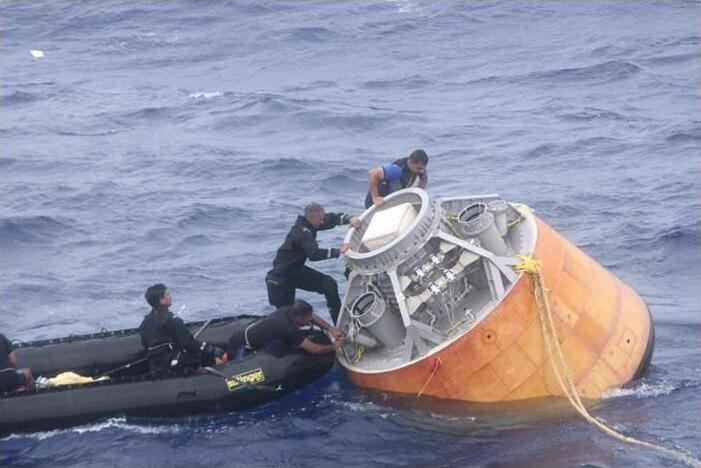
- Recovery of the CARE module
- Mission type: Technology
- Operator: ISRO
- Mission duration: 19 minutes
- Range: 1,600 kilometres (990 mi)
- Apogee: 126 kilometres (78 mi)

Spacecraft properties
- Spacecraft type: Space capsule (Boilerplate)
- Manufacturer: ISRO
- Launch mass: 3,735 kilograms (8,234 lb)
- Dimensions: 3.1 × 2.7 m (10.2 × 8.9 ft)

Start of mission
- Launch date: 18 December 2014, 04:00 UTC
- Rocket: LVM3-X
- Launch site: Satish Dhawan SLP
- Contractor: ISRO

End of mission
- Landing date: 18 December 2014, 04:15 UTC
- Landing site: Bay of Bengal
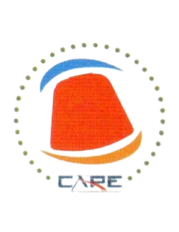
- CARE mission Badge IHSP

The Crew Module Atmospheric Re-entry Experiment (CARE) is an experimental test vehicle for the Indian Space Research Organisation's future ISRO orbital vehicle called Gaganyaan. It was launched successfully on 18 December 2014 from the Second Launch Pad of the Satish Dhawan Space Centre, by a LVM3 designated by ISRO as the LVM3 X CARE mission. Total cost of mission was ₹155 crore (equivalent to ₹270 crore or US$28 million in 2026). Cost of launch vehicle and CARE module was ₹140 crore and ₹15 crore.

== Characteristics of the vehicle ==
The crew module was mounted upside-down inside the payload fairing of the LVM3. CARE was made of aluminium alloy with carbon-fiber reinforced polymer (CFRP) panels and had a lift-off mass of 3,735 kg. Its diameter was 3100 mm and its height was 2698 mm. The module had an ablative thermal protection. The side panels were covered with medium density ablative (MDA) tiles and the forward heat shield was made of carbon phenolic tiles. It was powered by batteries and was equipped with six liquid-propellant (MMH/MON3) 100 N thrusters.

The deceleration system consists of two independent chains of parachutes: a primary parachute (31 meters in diameter), a drop parachute (6.2 meters in diameter), and a pilot parachute (2.3 meters in diameter).

== Preliminary tests ==
A practice run of the recovery of crew module was done on 31 October 2014 with Indian Coast Guard ship ICGS Samudra Pahredar.

== Mission description ==
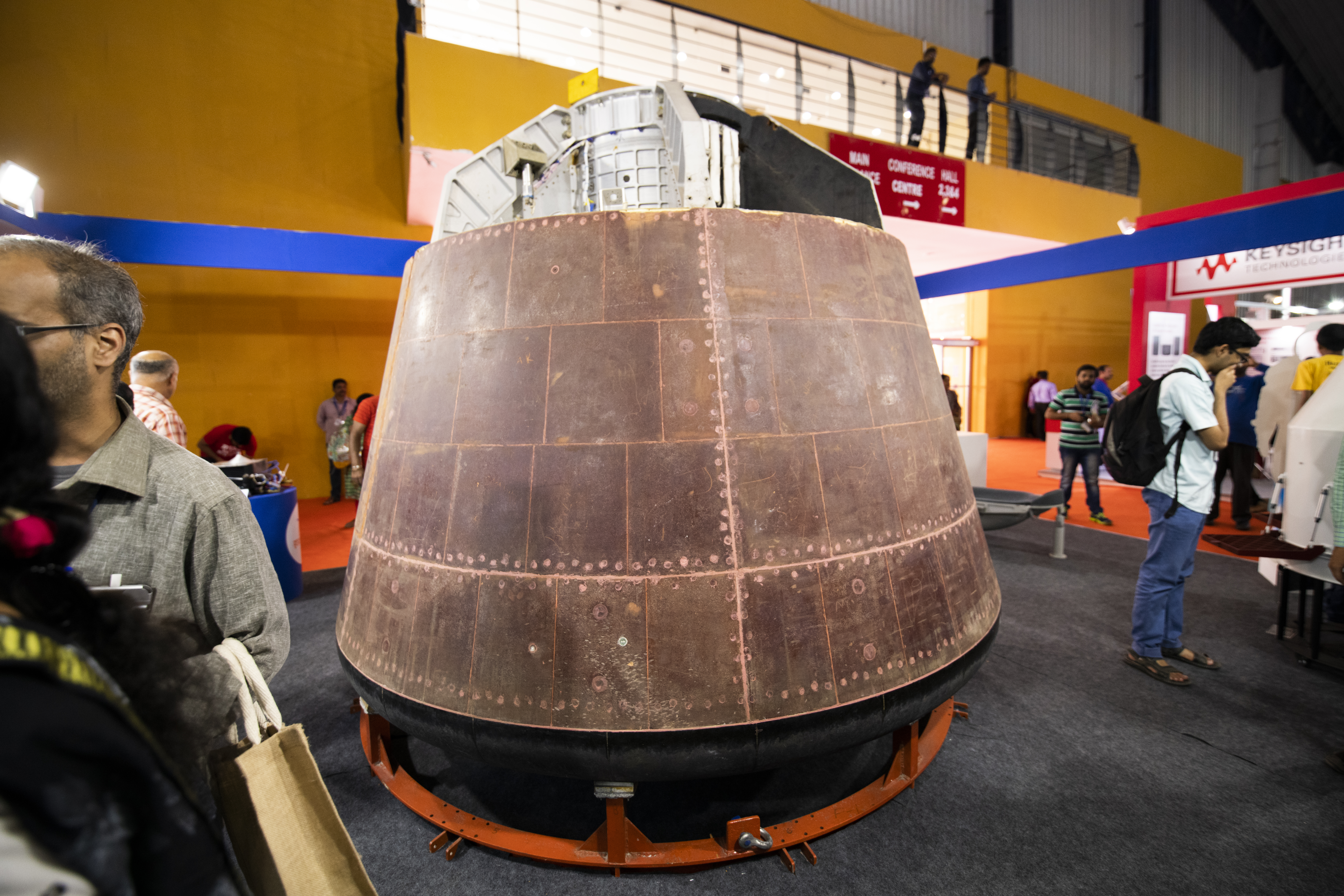
Recovered CARE module on display at Bangalore Space Expo 2018

CARE was launched on 18 December 2014 at 04:00 UTC. The crew module was separated at the intended height of 126 km and a speed of 5300 m/s. It entered a coast phase during which it performed three-axis control manoeuvres in order to ensure zero degree angle of attack at reentry.

The ballistic reentry started from an altitude of about 80 km. At this altitude, the propulsion was shut down. The heat shield experienced temperatures around 1,000 degrees C and the capsule experienced deceleration of up to 13 g.

After the re-entry the vehicle performed a descent and splashdown during which an end-to-end validation of the parachute system was performed, including the demonstration of the apex cover separation and the parachute deployment in cluster configuration. The deployment sequence started when CARE had slowed to a speed of 233 m/s. The crew module carried three stages of parachutes, all of which came in pairs. First, both 2.3-meter diameter pilot parachutes came out, followed by the 6.2-meter drogue parachutes, which cut the capsule's velocity down to 50 m/s. Then both main parachutes were deployed at a height of about 5 km. These parachutes, each 31 meters in diameter, were the largest ever made in India.

CARE splashed down into the Bay of Bengal about 600 km from Port Blair in the Andaman Islands and about 1600 km from the Sriharikota launch site. Immediately afterwards the main parachutes were detached. CARE was recovered by the Indian Coast Guard after tracking its signal beacon. The entire duration of the experiment from launch to splashdown was 20 minutes 43 seconds.

After recovery the module was brought to Chennai on 22 December 2014, from where it will be sent to the Satish Dhawan Space Centre for preliminary processing. The module will then be sent to the Vikram Sarabhai Space Centre for further study and analysis.

=== Telemetry from ISRO ===
Doordarshan's telecast of the LVM3 LVM3-X ascent and CARE module's ballistic descent showed screen displays of the following telemetry:

Time (Seconds)	Event	Observations
0.1	S200 ignition	Ground-lit ignition of 2 strap-on Solid Rocket Boosters
120	L110 ignition	Air-lit ignition of L110 core which contains 2 liquid fueled Vikas rocket engines
153.5	S200 separation	Ejection of 2 spent solid strap-on boosters
163.4	CLG initiated	CLG = Closed-Loop Guidance
237.2	Heat-shield separation	Nominal
324.6	L110 shut-off	Nominal: Relative Velocity 4.92 km/s, Range 565.6 km, Altitude 125.6 km, Azimuth 121.1 degrees
325.7	L110 separation	Nominal: Relative Velocity 4.95 km/s, Range 570.5 km, Altitude 125.4 km, Azimuth 121.1 degrees
330.8	CARE module separation	Nominal: Relative Velocity 4.96 km/s, Range 599.5 km, Altitude 125.1 km, Azimuth 121.1 degrees
341.0	CARE module CLG started	Nominal: Relative Velocity 4.96 km/s, Range 633.1 km, Altitude 125.2 km, Azimuth 121.1 degrees
385.5	CARE module in ballistic descent	Nominal: Relative Velocity 4.93 km/s, Range 858.8 km, Altitude 116.6 km, Azimuth 121.0 degrees
399.5	CARE module in ballistic descent	Nominal: Relative Velocity 4.94 km/s, Range 926.6 km, Altitude 111.8 km, Azimuth 121.0 degrees
419.5	CARE module in ballistic descent	Nominal: Relative Velocity 4.96 km/s, Range 1023.5 km, Altitude 103.1 km, Azimuth 121.0 degrees
440.5	CARE module in ballistic descent	Nominal: Relative Velocity 4.98 km/s, Range 1125.6 km, Altitude 91.8 km, Azimuth 121.0 degrees
460.6	CARE module reentry	Nominal
468.5	CARE module in ballistic descent	Nominal: Relative Velocity 5.00 km/s, Range 1262.4 km, Altitude 73.3 km, Azimuth 121.0 degrees
573.0	CARE module in descent	Nominal: Relative Velocity 0.244 km/s, Range 1534.5 km, Altitude 18.1 km
584.0	CARE module 15.5 km altitude	Nominal: Relative Velocity 0.210 km/s, Range 1535.6 km, Altitude 15.9 km
584.3	APEX cover separation	Nominal
584.5	CARE module in descent	Nominal: Relative Velocity 0.209 km/s, Range 1535.7 km, Altitude 15.8 km
589.4	Pilot Chute deployed	Nominal
596	CARE module in descent	Nominal: Relative Velocity 0.086 km/s, Range 1536.0 km, Altitude 14.2 km
740.6	CARE module 5 km altitude	Nominal
741.4	Main Chute deployed	CARE module's rate of descent increased abnormally prior to splash-down
751.0	CARE module in descent	Displayed telemetry: Relative Velocity 0.431 km/s, Range 1508.2 km, Altitude 0.9 km
755.0	CARE module in descent	Displayed telemetry: Relative Velocity 0.443 km/s, Range 1506.6 km, Altitude 0.6 km
760.0	CARE module in descent	Displayed telemetry: Relative Velocity 0.459 km/s, Range 1504.7 km, Altitude 0.1 km
761.0	CARE module in descent	Displayed telemetry: Relative Velocity 0.462 km/s, Range 1504.3 km, Altitude 0.0 km
779.0	CARE module in descent	Displayed telemetry: Relative Velocity 0.518 km/s, Range 1496.7 km, Altitude -1.7 km
833.0	CARE module in descent	Displayed telemetry: Relative Velocity 0.689 km/s, Range 1468.7 km, Altitude -7.8 km
940.0	CARE module in descent	Final display of telemetry: Relative Velocity 1.014 km/s, Range 1406.3 km, Altitude -21.0 km

== Industrial organisation ==
- Hindustan Aeronautics Limited
- Aerial Delivery Research and Development Establishment, Agra - parachute
- Valeth Hightech Composites

== See also ==
- Space Capsule Recovery Experiment by ISRO, flown in 2007
- Orbital Re-entry EXperiment by Japan, flown in 1994
- Atmospheric Reentry Demonstrator (A suborbital reentry test vehicle built by Aérospatiale of France for the European Space Agency and flown on the third Ariane 5 flight on October 21, 1998)
- Space Rider, Europe's future robotic spaceplane
- SpaceX Starship, reusable crewed spacecraft to be flown in 2020
