= Viking (rocket engine) =

Engines used in EU rocket Ariane

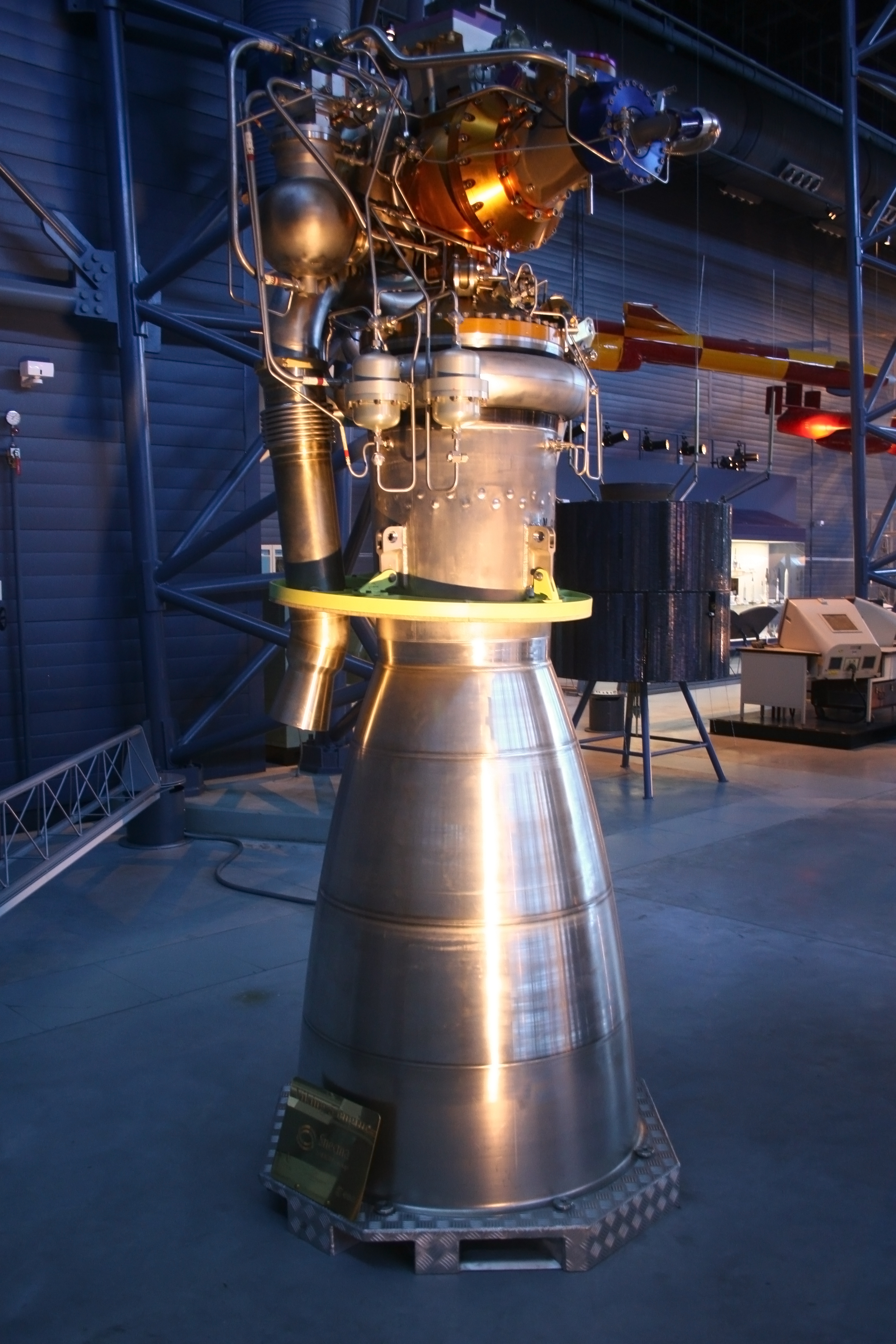
- Viking 5C rocket engine
- Country of origin: France
- First flight: 1979
- Last flight: 2003
- Designer: Société Européenne de Propulsion (SEP)
- Predecessor: None
- Successor: Vikas; Vulcain
- Status: Retired

Liquid-fuel engine
- Propellant: Dinitrogen tetroxide / UDMH or UH 25
- Mixture ratio: 1.7–1.86
- Cycle: Gas-generator cycle
- Pumps: 3 coaxial pumps

Configuration
- Chamber: Film-cooled, ablative throat insert
- Nozzle ratio: 10 (Viking 5C); 30.8 (Viking 4B)

Performance
- Thrust, vacuum: 690–805 kN (155,000–181,000 lb_{f})
- Thrust, sea-level: 611–678 kN (137,000–152,000 lb_{f})
- Thrust-to-weight ratio: 80–99
- Chamber pressure: 5.5 MPa (800 psi)
- Specific impulse, vacuum: 2.76–2.95 km/s (281–301 s)
- Specific impulse, sea-level: 2.43–2.79 km/s (248–284 s)
- Restarts: Unlimited
- Gimbal range: Fixed, swiveled, and gimbaled versions were made

Dimensions
- Length: 2.87–3.51 m (9.4–11.5 ft)
- Diameter: 0.95–1.7 m (3.1–5.6 ft)

Used in
- Ariane 1 – Ariane 4

The Viking rocket engines were members of a series of bipropellant engines for the first and second stages of the Ariane 1 through Ariane 4 commercial launch vehicles, using storable, hypergolic propellants: dinitrogen tetroxide and UH 25, a mixture of 75% UDMH and 25% hydrazine (originally UDMH).

The earliest versions, developed in 1965, had a sea-level thrust of about 190 kN. By 1971, the thrust had improved to 540 kN, with resulting engine named Viking 1 and adopted for the Ariane program. The engine first flown on the Ariane 1 rocket in 1979 was Viking 2, with thrust further improved to 611 kN.

The version used on the Ariane 4 first stage, which used a cluster of four, had 667 kN thrust each. The second stage of Ariane used a single Viking. Over 1000 were built, and achieved a high level of reliability from early in the programme.

The 144 Ariane 1 to 4 launchers used a total of 958 Viking engines. Only two engines led to a failure. The first failure (on second Ariane 1 flight 23 May 1980) was due to a chamber combustion instability. The vehicle had lost an attitude control and broke up. Several injector changes were implemented in the aftermath of the failure, and the fuel was changed from UDMH to UH 25.

The second failure was of human origin: a rag had been left in a water coolant pipe during installation, resulting in a loss of thrust and vehicle breakup due to off-centre thrust during launch on 22 February 1990.

Initially, all the engines were tested before being integrated on a launcher. Beginning in 1998, engineers, confident of the reliability of the engine, authorized the use of untested engines on launchers. One engine per year was tested, randomly taken from the assembly workshops. This confidence is very rare in the world of space engines.

An unusual feature of the Viking engines is their water tank and water pump, used to cool the exhaust gasses of the gas generator. The hot exhaust of the gas generator is cooled by water injection to 620 °C before being used to drive the three coaxial pumps (for water, fuel and oxidizer) and to pressurize the fuel tanks. The water was also used as a hydraulic fluid to actuate the valves.

== Technical data ==
| | Viking 2 | Viking 2B | Viking 4 | Viking 4B | Viking 5C | Viking 6 |
|---|---|---|---|---|---|---|
| Height | 2.87 m | 2.87 m | 3.51 m | 3.51 m | 2.87 m | 2.87 m |
| Diameter | 0.95 m | 0.99 m | 1.70 m | 1.70 m | 0.99 m | 0.99 m |
| Mass | 776 kg | 776 kg | 826 kg | 826 kg | 826 kg | 826 kg |
| Propellant | Dinitrogen tetroxide and UDMH in ratio 1.86:1 | Dinitrogen tetroxide and UH 25 in ratio 1.70:1 | Dinitrogen tetroxide and UDMH in ratio 1.86:1 | Dinitrogen tetroxide and UH 25 in ratio 1.70:1 | Dinitrogen tetroxide and UH 25 in ratio 1.70:1 | Dinitrogen tetroxide and UH 25 in ratio 1.71:1 |
| Propellant consumption | 250 kg/s | ca. 275 kg/s | ca. 275 kg/s | 273 kg/s | 244 kg/s | ca. 275 kg/s |
| Performance of the turbine | 2500 kW, 10,000 rpm | 2500 kW, 10,000 rpm | 2500 kW, 10,000 rpm | 2500 kW, 10,000 rpm | 2500 kW, 10,000 rpm | 2500 kW, 10,000 rpm |
| Vacuum thrust | 690 kN | ? | 713 kN | 805 kN | 758 kN | 750 kN |
| Sea level thrust | 611 kN | 643 kN | - | - | 678 kN | ? |
| Use | Ariane 1 | Ariane 2, 3 | Ariane 1 | Ariane 2 – 4 | Ariane 4 | PAL (Ariane 4 liquid booster) |

== See also ==
- Karl-Heinz Bringer - designer of Viking and A4 engine
