= Vikas (rocket engine) =

Indian rocket engine

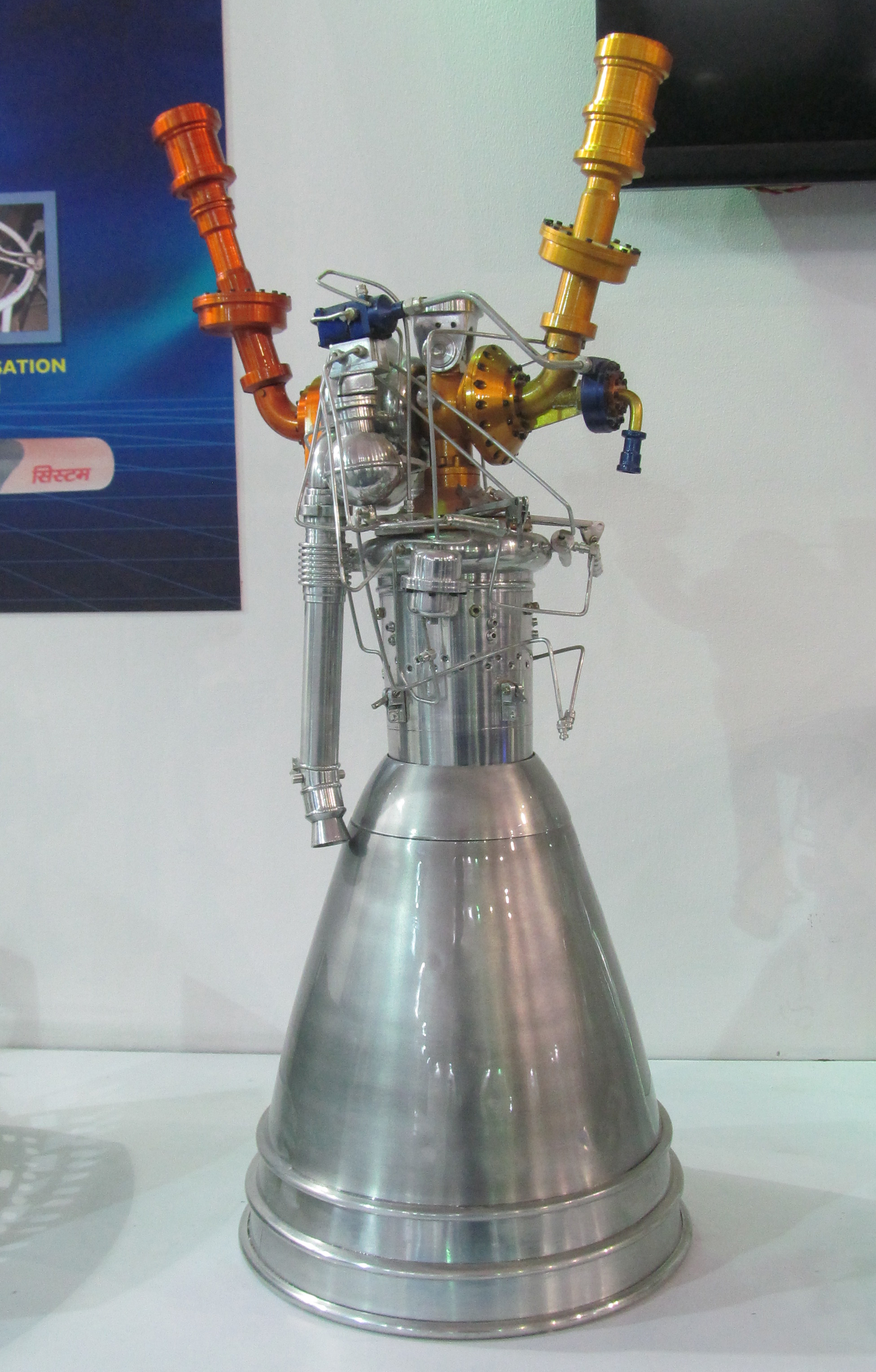
- Model of the Vikas engine
- Country of origin: India
- Designer: Société Européenne de Propulsion (SEP); ISRO (licensed version)
- Manufacturer: Godrej & Boyce and MTAR Technologies
- Predecessor: Viking
- Status: Active

Liquid-fuel engine
- Propellant: N_{2}O_{4} / UDMH
- Cycle: Gas generator

Performance
- Thrust: 821 kN
- Chamber pressure: 6.2 MPa (62 bar)
- Specific impulse, vacuum: 293 seconds (2.87 km/s)
- Specific impulse, sea-level: 262 seconds (2.57 km/s)

Dimensions
- Length: 3.70 m (12.1 ft)(Vikas-4B)
- Dry mass: 120 in (3,000 mm)

Used in
- 2nd stage of PSLV and GSLV; Main stage L110 of LVM3

The Vikas engine (a portmanteau from initials of VIKram Ambalal Sarabhai ) is a family of hypergolic liquid fuelled rocket engines conceptualized and designed by the Liquid Propulsion Systems Centre in the 1970s. The design was based on the licensed version of the Viking engine with the chemical pressurisation system. The early production Vikas engines used some imported French components which were later replaced by domestically produced equivalents. It is used in the Polar Satellite Launch Vehicle (PSLV), Geosynchronous Satellite Launch Vehicle (GSLV) and LVM3 for space launch use.

Vikas engine is used to power the second stage of PSLV, boosters and second stage of GSLV Mark I and II and also the core stage of LVM3. The propellant loading for Vikas engine in PSLV, GSLV Mark I and II is 40 tons, while in LVM3 is 55 tons.

== History ==
In 1974, Societe Europeenne de Propulsion agreed to transfer Viking engine technology in return for 100 man-years of engineering work from ISRO. The first engine built from the acquired technology was tested successfully in 1985 by Nambi Narayanan and his team at ISRO and named it Vikas. Most components for the VIKAS engine were made formerly by KELTEC, before being subsumed by Brahmos Aerospace.

== Technical details ==
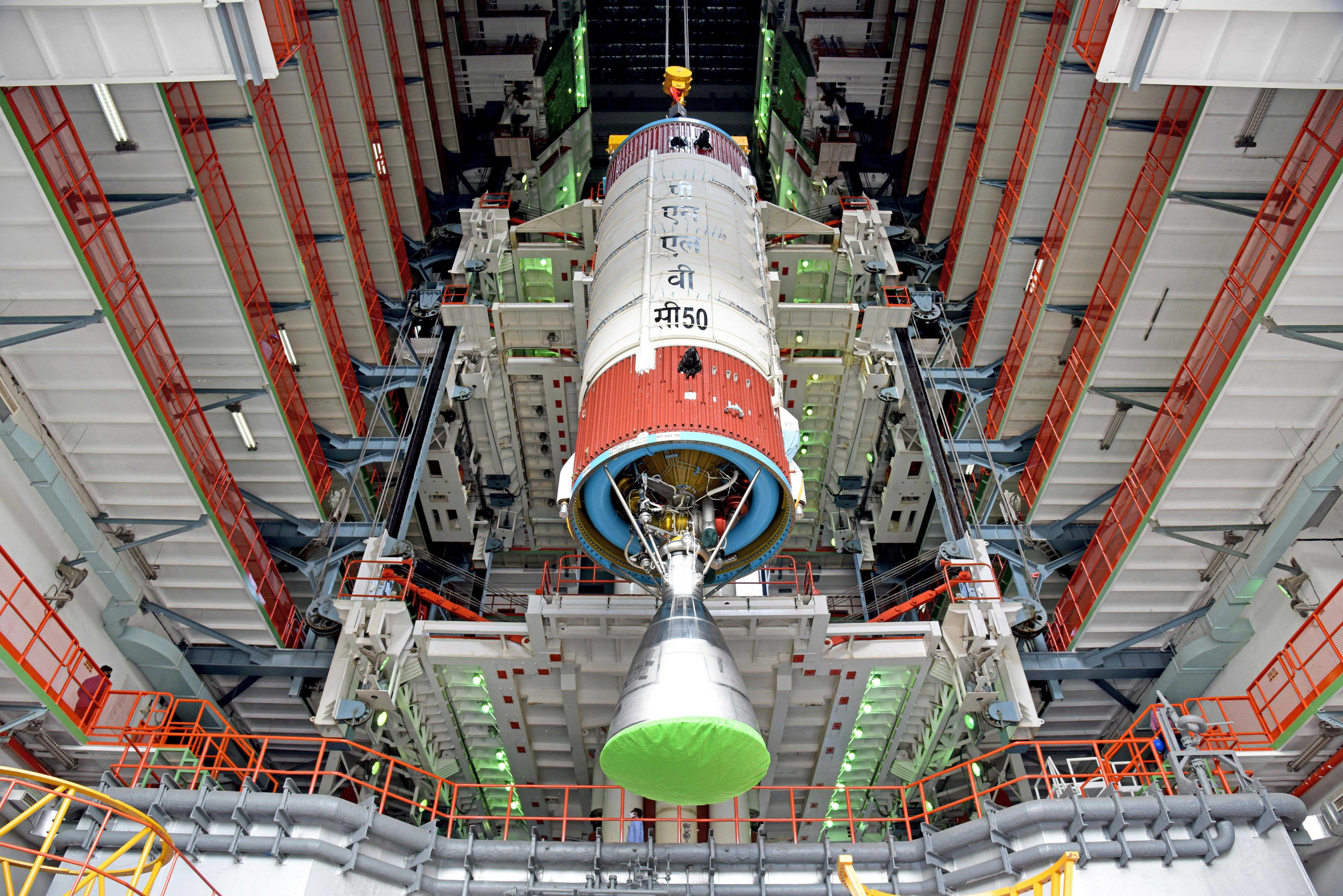
PSLV-C50 second stage with Vikas engine

The engine uses up about 40 metric tons of UDMH as fuel and nitrogen tetroxide (N_{2}O_{4}) as oxidizer with a maximum thrust of 725 kN. An upgraded version of the engine has a chamber pressure of 58.5 bar as compared to 52.5 bar in the older version and produces a thrust of 800 kN. The engine is capable of gimballing.

For launches from 2018 a 6% increased thrust version of the Vikas engine was developed. It was demonstrated on 29 March 2018 in the GSAT 6A launch second stage. It will be used for the four Vikas engines first-stage boosters on future missions. Tests were conducted on the Vikas engine in 2025 for future applicability to VTVL technologies.

== Variants ==
Type	Nozzle Diameter (m)	Length (m)	Nozzle Area Ratio	Chamber pressure (MPa)	Fuel	Mix Rate	Flow rate (kg/s)	Thrust (kN)		Specific Impulse (Ns/kg)		Launcher Stages
Type	Nozzle Diameter (m)	Length (m)	Nozzle Area Ratio	Chamber pressure (MPa)	Fuel	Mix Rate		Sea Level	Vacuum	Sea Level	Vacuum	Launcher Stages
Booster/first stage												
Vikas-1	~1.00	~2.75	13.9	5.30	UDMH / N_{2}O_{4}	1.86	246.9	600.5	680.5	2432	2756	GSLV Mk.I L40H Strapon
Vikas-1+	~1.00	~2.75	13.9	5.30	UH 25 / N_{2}O_{4}	1.87	271	677.7	765.5	2501	2824	GSLV Mk.II L40H Strapon
Vikas-X	~1.80	~3.75			UH 25 / N_{2}O_{4}		285.7	736.8	821.0	2579	2873	LVM3 L110 stage
Second stage												
Vikas-2	~1.50	~3.50		5.35	UDMH / N_{2}O_{4}	1.86	249.8	-	725.0		2903	GSLV Mk.I GS2 stage, PSLV PS2 stage
Vikas-2B	~1.80	~3.70		5.85	UH 25 / N_{2}O_{4}	1.71	271.6	-	804.5		2962	GSLV Mk.II GS2 stage, PSLV PS2 stage

== See also ==
- Liquid Propulsion Systems Centre
- ISRO Propulsion Complex
- Polar Satellite Launch Vehicle
- Geosynchronous Satellite Launch Vehicle
- LVM3
- SE-2000
- RLV-TD Reusable Launch Vehicle Technology Demonstration
- RD-120 – Russian rocket engine on which the SCE-200 is supposedly based.
- RD-810 – Ukrainian rocket engine with very similar characteristics.
- RD-170
