= Elstertrebnitz =

- Municipality
- Coat of arms

- Location of Elstertrebnitz within Leipzig district
- Interactive map of Elstertrebnitz
- Location within Germany Location within Saxony
- Coordinates: 51°9′N 12°14′E
- Country: Germany
- State: Saxony
- District: Leipzig
- Subdivisions: 7

Government
  - Mayor (2022–29): David Zühlke (CDU)

Area
  - Total: 11.66 km^{2} (4.50 sq mi)
- Elevation: 129 m (423 ft)

Population (2025-12-31)
  - Total: 1,315
  - Density: 112.8/km^{2} (292.1/sq mi)
- Time zone: UTC+01:00 (CET)
  - Summer (DST): UTC+02:00 (CEST)
- Postal codes: 04523
- Dialling codes: 034296
- Vehicle registration: L, BNA, GHA, GRM, MTL, WUR

Elstertrebnitz is a municipality in Saxony, lying southwest of Leipzig and northeast of Zeitz.

== Geography ==
Elstertrebnitz lies to the south of Leipzig, in a low-lying basin approximately 15 km northeast of Zeitz.

=== Neighbouring municipalities ===
Elstertrebnitz is bordered to the north by the town Pegau, to the northeast by the town Groitzsch, by the region Elsteraue in the south and region Hohenmölsen in the west. The regions Elstertrebnitz and Hohenmölsen are separated by the open cast mine Profen.

== Economy ==
The municipality is largely agricultural.

=== Elstermühlgraben ===
The Elstermühlgraben is the name of a flume diverted from the river Elster. The Elstermühlgraben operated the mills from the Elstertrebnitz to Kleindalzig until the 20th century. Very few mills are in operation today. Above all, the flume served the villagers for bathing and as a water source for needed washing water. The Pegauer Baths, which lie directly beside the Elstermühlgraben, cleaned and used the water for their facility. But the flume was also used as a transport route for various uses.
