= UH 25 =

Liquid rocket propellant

UH 25 is a fuel mixture for rockets. It was developed for the European Ariane 2–4 launch vehicles.

UH 25 was developed after a disaster during flight 2 of the Ariane 1 rocket. During launch, one of the four Viking engines on the first stage developed a combustion instability which led to an engine fire, subsequent explosion and destruction of the vehicle. Following this event and starting with Ariane 2, the fuel was changed from pure UDMH to the mixture UH 25.

UH 25 was used in Ariane rocket versions 2 through 4, and in the Indian GSLV Mk III.

UH 25 is a mixture of 75% UDMH and 25% hydrazine hydrate. It is hypergolic with dinitrogen tetroxide as oxidizer, and both can be stored as liquids at room temperature.

== Danger ==
Like its components, UH 25 is flammable, toxic (carcinogenic) and corrosive.

=== Safety labels ===
T Toxic	F Easily flammable

== See also ==
- Aerozine 50 - a 50:50 mix of hydrazine and UDMH
- C-Stoff, the mix of hydrazine and methanol fuel used for the HWK 109-509 German rocket motor series
