= CIIA =

CIIA may refer to the:

- Canadian Institute of International Affairs, now the Canadian International Council
- Certified International Investment Analyst, (CIIA) - a global investment designation offered by EFFAS and ASAF.
- Chartered Institute of Internal Auditors
- Christmas Island Internet Administration
- Critical Infrastructure Information Act of 2002, Title II of the Homeland Security Act
