= Gay Nigger Association of America =

Defunct internet trolling group

- Abbreviation: GNAA
- Formation: 2002; 24 years ago
- Type: Internet trolls
- Purpose: Trolling
- Affiliations: Goatse Security
- Website: www.gnaa.eu

The Gay Nigger Association of America (GNAA) was an Internet trolling group known for targeting several prominent websites and internet personalities, including Slashdot, Wikipedia, CNN, Barack Obama, Alex Jones, and prominent members of the blogosphere. They also released software products, and leaked screenshots and information about upcoming operating systems. In addition, they maintained a software repository and a wiki-based site dedicated to internet commentary.

Members of the GNAA also founded Goatse Security, a grey hat information security group. Members of Goatse Security released information in June 2010 about email addresses on AT&T's website from people who had subscribed to mobile data service using the iPad. After the vulnerability was disclosed, the then-president of the GNAA, weev, and a GNAA member, "JacksonBrown", were arrested.

== Origins, known members and name ==
The group was run by a president. New media researcher Andrew Lih stated that it was unclear whether or not there was initially a clearly defined group of GNAA members, or if founding and early members of the GNAA were online troublemakers united under the name in order to disrupt websites. However, professor Jodi Dean and Ross Cisneros claimed that they were an organized group of anti-blogging trolls. Reporters also referred to the GNAA as a group.

In her 2017 book Troll Hunting, Australian journalist Ginger Gorman identified the president of the GNAA as an individual from Colorado known as "Meepsheep". Known former presidents of the GNAA were security researcher Jaime "asshurtmacfags" Cochran, who also co-founded the hacking group "Rustle League", and "timecop", founder of the anime fansub group "Dattebayo". Other members included former president Andrew "weev" Auernheimer, Daniel "JacksonBrown" Spitler, and former spokesman Leon Kaiser. GNAA has also been documented as having been loosely affiliated with the satirical wiki Encyclopedia Dramatica.

The group's name incited controversy and was described as "causing immediate alarm in anyone with a semblance of good taste," "intentionally offensive", and "spectacularly offensive". The group denied allegations of racism and homophobia, explaining that the name was intended to sow disruption on the internet and challenge social norms, claiming it was derived from the 1992 Danish satirical blaxploitation film Gayniggers from Outer Space. In an interview on the OfFenzive podcast, president Weev recalled an anecdote where the organization allegedly did actually once contain a member that was a homosexual black male.

== Trolling ==
The GNAA used many different methods of trolling. One was to simply "crapflood" a weblog's comment form with text consisting of repeated words and phrases. On Wikipedia, members of the group created an article about the group, while adhering to Wikipedia's rules and policies, a process Andrew Lih says "essentially [used] the system against itself". Another method included attacking many Internet Relay Chat channels and networks using different IRC flooding techniques.

The GNAA also produced shock sites containing malware. One such site, "Last Measure", contained embedded malware that opened up "an endless cascade of pop-up windows displaying pornography or horrific medical pictures". They also performed proof of concept demonstrations. These actions occasionally interrupted the normal operation of popular websites.

=== 2000s ===
In July 2004, two GNAA members submitted leaked screenshots of the upcoming operating system Mac OS X v10.4 to the popular Macintosh news website MacRumors.

In June 2005, the GNAA announced that it had created a Mac OS X Tiger release for Intel x86 processors which caught media attention from various sources. The next day, the supposed leak was mentioned on the G4 television show Attack of the Show. The ISO image released via BitTorrent merely booted a shock image instead of the leaked operating system.

On February 3, 2007, the GNAA successfully managed to convince CNN reporter Paula Zahn that "one in three Americans" believe that the September 11, 2001, terror attacks were carried out by Israeli agents. CNN subsequently ran a story erroneously reporting this, involving a round-table discussion regarding antisemitism and an interview with the father of a Jewish 9/11 victim. The GNAA-owned website said that "over 4,000" Jews were absent from work at the World Trade Center on 9/11.

On February 11, 2007, an attack was launched on the website of US presidential candidate (and future US president) Barack Obama, where the group's name was caused to appear on the website's front page.

=== 2010s ===
In late January 2010, the GNAA used a then-obscure phenomenon known as cross-protocol scripting (a combination of cross-site scripting and inter-protocol exploitation) to cause users of the Freenode IRC network to unknowingly flood IRC channels after visiting websites containing inter-protocol exploits. They also have used a combination of inter-protocol, cross-site, and integer overflow bugs in both the Firefox and Safari web browsers to flood IRC channels.

On October 30, 2012, the GNAA began a trolling campaign in the aftermath of Hurricane Sandy on the US East Coast, spreading fake photographs and tweets of alleged looters in action. After the GNAA published a press-release detailing the incident, mainstream media outlets began detailing how the prank was carried out.

On December 3, 2012, the GNAA was identified as being responsible for a cross-site scripting attack on Tumblr that resulted in thousands of Tumblr blogs being defaced with a pro-GNAA message.

In January 2013, the GNAA collaborated with users on the imageboard 4chan to start a "#cut4bieber" trend on Twitter, encouraging fans of Canadian pop singer Justin Bieber to practice self-harm.

From 2014 into 2015, GNAA members began playing an active role in the Gamergate controversy, sabotaging efforts made by pro-Gamergate parties. Several GNAA members were able to gain administrative access to 8chan's (an imageboard associated with Gamergate) primary Gamergate board, which they disrupted and ultimately closed. The GNAA also claimed responsibility for releasing private information related to many pro-Gamergate activists.

On October 13, 2016, GNAA member Meepsheep vandalized Wikipedia to cause the entries for Bill and Hillary Clinton to be overlapped with pornographic images and a message endorsing Republican presidential candidate Donald Trump.

In August 2017, GNAA was named as having been involved in a feud between employees of the popular dating app Bumble, and tenants of the apartment building in Austin, Texas where the company was, at the time, illegally headquartered. Joseph Bernstein of BuzzFeed News reported that one of the building's residents contacted GNAA to "fight back" against Bumble after multiple complaints regarding the company's activities were ignored. The dispute resulted in Bumble choosing to relocate from the building, which GNAA claimed credit for in a press release the group spammed across several websites via clickjacking.

== Goatse Security ==
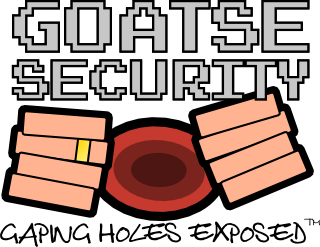
Goatse Security's logo. Their logo and name are a reference to the infamous shock site goatse.cx.

In December 2009, several members of the GNAA with expertise in grey hat computer security research created the "Goatse Security" group to uncover security vulnerabilities. The members chose to use a separate name to publish their work because they thought that they would not be taken seriously when publishing under "GNAA".

In June 2010, Goatse Security attracted mainstream media attention for their discovery of at least 114,000 unsecured email addresses registered to Apple iPad devices for early adopters of Apple's 3G iPad service. The data was aggregated from AT&T's own servers by feeding a publicly available script with HTTP requests containing randomly generated ICC-IDs, which would then return the associated email address. The FBI soon investigated the incident. This investigation led to the arrest of the then-GNAA President, Andrew 'weev' Auernheimer, on unrelated drug charges resulting from an FBI search of his home.

In January 2011, the Department of Justice announced that Auernheimer would be charged with one count of conspiracy to access a computer without authorization and one count of fraud. A co-defendant, Daniel Spitler, was released on bail. In June 2011, Spitler pleaded guilty on both counts after reaching a plea agreement with US attorneys. On November 20, 2012, Auernheimer was found guilty of one count of identity fraud and one count of conspiracy to access a computer without authorization. On April 11, 2014, these convictions were overturned by the U.S. Court of Appeals for the Third Circuit on the basis that the New Jersey venue was improper and Auernheimer was subsequently released from prison.
