= Celestri =

The Celestri Multimedia LEO System was a planned Low Earth orbit (LEO) satellite constellation, which was intended to offer global, low-latency broadband Internet services via Ka-band radio links. It was planned by Motorola circa 1997-1998 as one of the earliest "Internet in the sky" constellations, and as a successor to the company's Iridium satellite constellation, but never built or launched.

The Celestri constellation was envisioned to consist of 63 operational satellites in 7 orbital planes, inclined at 48° with respect to the Equator, plus up to 7 in-orbit spares. Satellites in each plane would follow circular orbits at an altitude of 1400 kilometers. Each satellite was envisioned to contain all hardware and software needed to route traffic throughout the network, including Earth-to-space in the 28.6-29.1 GHz and 29.5-30.0 GHz bands, space-to Earth in the 18.8-19.3 GHz and 19.7-20.2 GHz bands, and space-to-space connections via optical inter-satellite links. Satellites were expected to employ phased array antennas supporting 432 uplink beams and 260 downlink beams per satellite, provided by Raytheon, to communicate with Celestri ground stations, which would have equivalent antenna aperture sizes from 0.3 to 1 meter to support communications at rates from 2.048 to 155.52 Mbps.

Celestri's anticipated cost was $12.9 billion. In May 1998, Motorola announced that it was dropping its plans for the Celestri system, and instead would invest $750 million in the rival Teledesic constellation. The combined project was ultimately abandoned in 2003.
