= Satellite internet constellation =

Satellite constellation providing internet connectivity

A satellite internet constellation is a constellation of artificial satellites providing satellite internet service. In particular, the term has come to refer to a new generation of very large constellations (sometimes referred to as megaconstellations) orbiting in low Earth orbit (LEO) to provide low-latency, high bandwidth (broadband) internet service. As of 2020, 63 percent of rural households worldwide lacked internet access due to the infrastructure requirements of underground cables and network towers. Satellite internet constellations offer a low-cost solution for expanding coverage.

== History ==
While more-limited satellite internet services have been available through geosynchronous commsats orbiting in geostationary orbit for years, these have been of quite limited bandwidth (not broadband), high-latency, and provided at such a relatively high price that demand for the services offered has been quite low.

In the 1990s, several LEO satellite internet constellations were proposed and developed, including Celestri (63 satellites) and Teledesic (initially 840, later 288 satellites). These projects were abandoned after the bankruptcy of the Iridium and Globalstar satellite phone constellations in the early 2000s.

In the 2010s, interest in satellite internet constellations reemerged due to the dropping cost of launching to space and the increased demand for broadband internet access. Internet satellite constellations are planned by private companies like OneWeb (OneWeb constellation), SpaceX (Starlink), Amazon (Leo), and Russia's Roscosmos (Sfera) and China (Hongwan, 2018, or national satellite internet project, 2021). By late 2018, more than 18,000 new satellites had been proposed to be launched and placed in LEO orbits between 2019 and 2025. This is more than ten times as many satellites as the sum of all active satellites in space as of March 2018. More recent proposals by 2020 could bring that number to over 100,000.

A year after the start of fielding the first satellite internet constellation—Starlink which began launching in late 2019 and began beta test of the network in late 2020; OneWeb began satellite deployment in 1H2020—the competitive disruption to established satellite company business models began to be better understood. In early 2021, the three largest European satellite operators SES, Eutelsat, and Hispasat—which had until that time eschewed developing and fielding a broadband satellite internet constellation with private funds—informed the European Commission that they would be willing to invest in the development of such a project if the European Union were to invest government funds in the effort as well. All three companies had formerly focused on the provision of communication services from GEO and MEO orbits, while the newer satellite internet providers have been fielding their constellations exclusively in LEO. In March 2025, the largest of the three operators, SES entered into a partnership with satellite direct-to-device (D2D) provider, Lynk Global to route traffic between Lynk's LEO constellation and SES’s MEO satellites and gateways to enable secure real-time data delivery and reduce requirements for ground infrastructure.

In 2026, Russia started deploying the Rassvet low Earth orbit constellation for high-speed data transmission, planning to start a partial service in 2027 extending to a continuous entire country service by 2030. That satellite network consists of a "few dozen" satellites in orbit,(as of August 2026).

== Design ==
Proposed systems vary greatly in the number of satellites, the types of orbits and the telecommunication architecture (in particular the presence or absence of inter-satellite links). System designs have been analyzed using statistical methods and simulations to estimate the total throughput. Particularly challenging is the dynamic nature of the network, as LEO satellites typically pass over a given location in less than 10 minutes.

== Potential ==
For continental distances (greater than about 3,000 km), LEO satellite internet networks are expected to be able to provide lower latency than optical fiber links. This is expected to hold even without inter-satellite links, using only ground station relays. The new networks are said to be able to "potentially compete with today's ISPs in many settings".

=== Issues and criticism ===
Critics have objected against the increased light pollution for astronomy, the increased possibility of satellite collisions resulting in space debris and, more generally, a lack of end-of-life cleanup for the increasing number of satellites that would become space debris.

Astronomers have studied the potential effects increased satellite usage in Low Earth Orbit would have on Very Large Telescope that use ultra-wide imaging exposures, such as the 8.4-meter Simonyi Survey Telescope used in the Legacy Survey of Space and Time project at the Vera C. Rubin Observatory. They found that 30 to 40% of exposures could be compromised during the first and last hours of the night. A study found that twilight observations are particularly affected by SC and that the fraction of streaked images taken during twilight has increased from less than 0.5% in late 2019 to 18% in August 2021 due to SpaceX Starlink Satellites. Astronomers have also voiced concern over the impact satellite internet constellations will have on radio astronomy.

Additional research is needed to determine impact of (inter alia) light pollution on various locations, communities, indigenous peoples, and other forms of observation.

=== Mitigation in astronomy ===
A report from the SATCON1 workshop in 2020 concluded that the effects of large satellite constellations can severely affect some astronomical research efforts and lists six ways to mitigate harm to astronomy. In 2022, the IAU announced the Centre for the Protection of the Dark and Quiet Sky from Satellite Constellation Interference to coordinate or aggregate measures to mitigate such detrimental effects. The AAS is maintaining a living document that tracks recent progress in the field.

=== Space governance ===
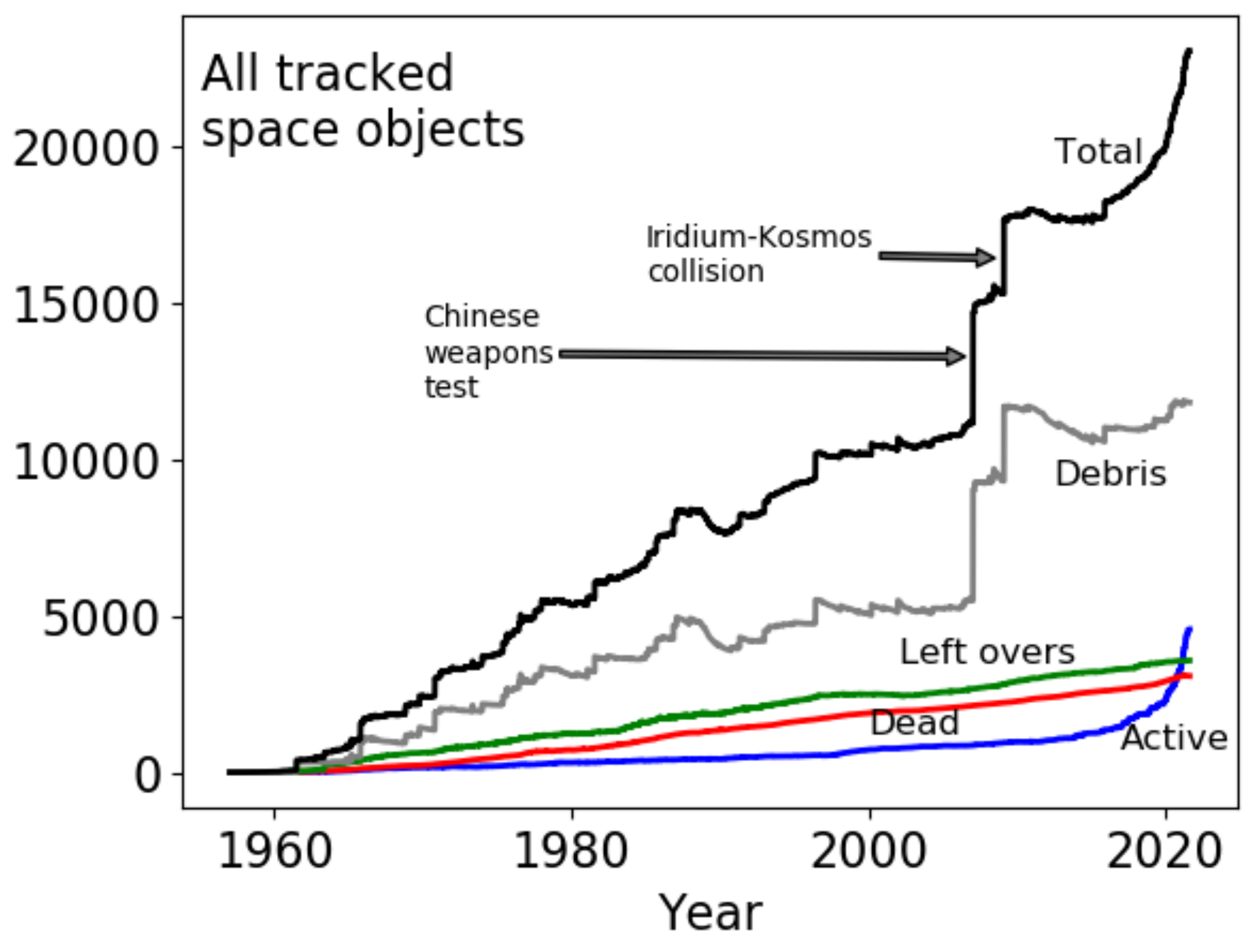
The growth of all tracked objects in space over time showing a recent increase of active satellites

UN Guidelines and ISO standard 24113 on space debris mitigation "encourages" organizations to voluntarily:

- Limit debris released during normal operations
- Minimize the potential for on-orbit break-ups
- Post-mission disposal
- Prevention of on-orbit collisions

A study suggests policies could help achieve the goal of debris mitigation and space sustainability. A team of scientists outlined rationale for governance that regulates the current free externalization of true costs and risks, treating orbital space around the Earth as an "additional ecosystem" or a common "part of the human environment" which should be subject to the same concerns and regulations like e.g. oceans on Earth. The study concludes that it needs "new policies, rules and regulations at national and international level".

As of 2022, global space activity is not sufficiently shaped by any international entity, and therefore "there is no common set of rules that govern global space activity and no mechanisms to ensure the proper disposal of hardware at the completion of space missions. Nor is there any coordinated effort to clean up the decades of space debris already accumulated in orbit."

=== Federation of Cross-Orbit Satellite Networks ===
There exist many satellite operators at LEO, MEO, and GEO. Similar to the Internet, which is a network of networks, satellite networks of different operators can also form federated networks of satellite networks.

== Constellations ==
=== Operational ===
==== Megaconstellations (1,000+ satellites) ====
- Amazon Leo – A United States satellite internet constellation developed by Amazon. The planned constellation consists of 3,236 satellites in low Earth orbit. Commercial service began in 2025.
- Guowang – A Chinese satellite internet megaconstellation operated by China Satellite Network Group (SatNet). The planned constellation consists of more than 13,000 satellites.
- Qianfan – A Chinese satellite internet megaconstellation developed by Shanghai Spacecom Satellite Technology (SSST). The project aims to deploy approximately 14,000 satellites in low Earth orbit, with launches beginning in August 2024.
- Starlink – A satellite internet constellation operated by SpaceX. The network consists of thousands of satellites in low Earth orbit and provides broadband internet and direct-to-device connectivity services worldwide. Public service began in 2021.

==== Smaller LEO constellations ====
- BlueBird – A satellite-to-mobile communications constellation operated by AST SpaceMobile, in partnership with AT&T and Verizon
- Globalstar – An operational constellation of 24 low Earth orbiting (LEO) satellites for satellite phone and low-speed data communications, covering most of the world's landmass. The launch of the second-generation constellation was completed on February 6, 2013.
- Iridium — an operational constellation of 66 cross-linked satellites in a polar orbit, used to provide satellite phone and low-speed data services over the entire surface of Earth. Iridium NEXT, a second-generation constellation of the communications satellites, was completed on January 11, 2019.
- Lynk Global – A direct-to-mobile constellation of five satellites designed to connect standard mobile phones.
- OneWeb – A low Earth orbit satellite internet constellation comprising 648 operational satellites. The system became operational in 2023 and is operated by Eutelsat.
- Orbcomm — an operational constellation used to provide global asset monitoring and messaging services from its constellation of 29 LEO communications satellites orbiting at 775 km

==== Non-LEO constellations ====
- O3b mPOWER – A medium Earth orbit communications satellite constellation operated by SES providing broadband connectivity services.
- Viasat, Inc. — a current broadband satellite provider operating 9 satellites in geostationary orbit providing fixed, ground mobile, and airborne antennas

=== Planned ===
- Honghu-3 — joint venture between Hong Qing Tech (48% owned by LandSpace) and LandSpace with 10000 satellites in LEO.
- Infrastructure for Resilience, Interconnectivity and Security by Satellite (IRIS²) — planned multi-orbit satellite internet constellation to be deployed by the European Union by 2027.
- Lightspeed — Broadband constellation by Telesat, to be deployed starting in 2026.
- OQ Technology — A Luxembourg-based company developing a 5G Non-Terrestrial Network that is expected to consist of 48 satellites in 2027 and 150 satellites in 2029.
- Rassvet — developed by Russian aerospace company Bureau 1440, developing a low Earth orbit constellation for high-speed broadband data transmission. As of 2026, 32 Rassvet-3 production satellites have been launched (with 31 active in orbit). The project aims to deploy over 250 satellites by 2027 to begin commercial service, extending to a continuous entire country service by 2030.
- Sfera — a satellite constellation project of the Russian Federation, with plans for up to 640 satellites. Test launch on October 23, 2022.
- TeraWave — a Blue Origin project with 5280 satellites in LEO and 128 satellites in MEO with the first deployments planned for 2027.
- UASAT — first launch scheduled for October 2026, with aims of launching 120 satellites by 2027.

=== Defunct ===
- Teledesic — a former (1990s) venture to accomplish broadband satellite internet services

== See also ==
- Satellite navigation
- Satellite constellation
- Light pollution
- Two-way communication satellite constellations
- Satellite Internet access
