= Morten Lindberg =

Morten Lindberg may refer to:

- Master Fatman (Morten Mabunda Lindberg), Danish media personality and creative
- Morten Lindberg (sound engineer), Norwegian sound engineer and music producer
