= SAAC =

SAAC may refer to:

- Comodoro Pierrestegui Airport, Argentina (ICAO code)
- Securities Analysts Association of China
- Scottish Artists and Artist Craftsmen, former name of Visual Arts Scotland
- South African Armoured Corps
- San Antonio Aviation Cadet Center, now Lackland Air Force Base, in Texas
- Swiss American Aviation Corporation, see Learjet 23
- South Atlantic Athletic Conference, a defunct intercollegiate athletic conference of historically black colleges and universities in the United States
