= Internet in Christmas Island =

The Internet in Christmas Island is supplied by Christmas Island Fibre Internet (CiFi).

According to the 2016 Australian census, 78.5% of the island's population accessed the Internet from home.

== History ==
From March 2017 to October 2021, Christmas Island's Internet services were previously supplied by Speedcast, using the SES 03b MEO satellite constellation for off-island backhaul. Speedcast ceased operations on Christmas Island in October 2021.

Prior to 2017, internet services were available via the Christmas Island Internet Administration Limited (CiiA), but were cut on 1 March 2017, affecting about 1,000 customers' 4G and fixed wireless services. Landline and 2G services were not affected. The company stated it was forced to close because it could not compete with the National Broadband Network (NBN). CiiA lodged a complaint with the Australian Competition & Consumer Commission to stop the NBN rollout, but failed. The Department of Infrastructure and Regional Development stated the company had refused financial support.

On 14 March 2017, Speedcast announced it had reached an agreement with the Australian Government to deliver wireless and 4G services until 30 June of the same year, to allow a transition period until more NBN services were installed. Minister for Local Government and Territories Fiona Nash thanked Speedcast for "stepping in to provide an internet service that will get Christmas Island back online."

== See also ==
- .cx – Internet domain name for Christmas Island
- goatse.cx
