= Lynk Global =

American satellite communications company

- Logo of Lynk Global
- Type: Privately held company
- Industry: Satellite communications
- Founded: July 9, 2017; 9 years ago
- Founder: Charles Miller; Margo Deckard; Tyghe Speidel
- Defunct: August 14, 2026
- Successor: Elveo
- Headquarters: Falls Church, Virginia, U.S.
- Areas served: Worldwide (more than 50+ countries)
- Key people: Ramu Potarazu (Chairman and CEO)
- Services: Sat2Phone; Satellite-Direct-to-Standard-Phone Connectivity
- Number of employees: 104 (2026)
- Parent: Lynk Global, Inc.
- Website: lynk.world

Lynk Global is an American company developing a satellite-to-mobile-phone satellite constellation that aims to provide a "cell tower in space" capability for global mobile phone service coverage, including in underserved rural areas without cellular coverage.

Lynk has requested a license from the US Federal Communications Commission to launch up to ten test satellites as early as 2022, with the goal to begin continuous global coverage in 2025 using a constellation of several thousand satellites.

As of March 2025, Lynk has an agreement with global satellite operator, SES, for funding and services using SES's fleet of geostationary and medium Earth orbit satellites and ground infrastructure to enhance Lynk's direct-to-device capabilities.

== History ==
Lynk Global Inc. was founded in 2017 by Charles Miller, Margo Deckard, and Tyghe Speidel. The business plan for Lynk came out of a multi-year effort to look for the killer app for small satellites, specifically satellites as small as cubesat-class nanosatellites, which led to the concept of connecting a satellite directly to a mobile phone. The idea had been thought to not be possible by some, but the Lynk concept and patents gave Lynk founders and investors confidence it was achievable. Lynk raised US$20 million from investors during early years and expects to raise a US$100 million round later in 2021.

In February 2020, Lynk "sent the world's first text message from a satellite in orbit to a standard mobile phone on the ground" in a test supported by both NASA and several mobile network operators.

On 25 May 2021, Lynk filed with the US telecommunications regulator, the FCC, to license Lynk's satellites and multiple satellite launches, with the goal to enable global mobile connectivity from space-based assets.

By May 2021, Lynk had launched four "cell-tower-in-space" test satellites into orbit. The fifth one, Shannon, was launched on 29 June 2021 and is a test sat of a new design suitable for mass production. Shannon is larger and operates at a higher power level and greater telecom capacity than the earlier test satellites. According to Lynk, the design is capable of being scaled up to provide greater communications throughput.

On 25 July 2023, Lynk published the first public video demonstrating a satellite-to-phone voice-call, though earlier in April of the same year, AST SpaceMobile claimed to have made the first space-based two-way telephone call with an unmodified smartphone.

In March 2025, Lynk Global and satellite operator SES announced a partnership, in which SES will provide investment in Lynk Global along with integrated services to relay traffic between the Lynk Low Earth orbit (LEO) satellite constellation and SES's O3b mPOWER medium Earth orbit (LEO) satellite system to access gateways for secure real-time data delivery; and telemetry, tracking, command and monitoring services. Lynk and SES will also collaborate in the development of Lynk’s network architecture and satellite manufacturing in the US and Europe.

== Technology ==
According to the company, Lynk satellite mobile technology is capable of connecting to standard mobile phones from satellites in 500 km (310 mi)-altitude orbits.

Lynk technology connects to mobile phones on the ground in a way similar to roaming networks, where the satellite mobile service will connect to another available cellular network when outside the range of its home network. To accomplish the regulatory side of this novel telecommunications method will require that Lynk work through the various geographically dispersed, and often country-specific, mobile network operators in any area of the world in which the service is to be available.

== Satellites launched ==
The first Lynk payloads to be tested in space have been flown attached to Cygnus spacecraft following their departure from the ISS. The first was tested on Cygnus NG-10 in February 2019, the second on Cygnus NG-11 in August 2019 and the third on Cygnus NG-12 in January 2020. Those have been followed by two free-flying test satellites, Lynk 04 ULTP and Lynk 06 Shannon, that have been launched on Falcon 9 Block 5 rockets in March 2020 and June 2021 respectively. The launch of operational satellites, named Lynk Towers, started in April 2022 with 5 satellites launched as of May 3 2026.

Satellite	COSPAR ID	Catalog N°	Launch date	Launch vehicle	Orbit altitude	Inclination
Test satellites
Lynk 04 ULTP	2020-011D	45605	7 March 2020	Falcon 9 Block 5	456 km x 464 km	51.6°
Lynk-06 Shannon	2021-059BM	48938	30 June 2021	Falcon 9 Block 5	505 km x 528 km	97.6°
Operational satellites
Lynk Tower 1 (Lynk-05)	2022-033F	52162	1 April 2022	Falcon 9 Block 5	Decayed on 12 March 2026	
Lynk Tower 3 (Lynk-08)	2023-001AP	55046	3 January 2023	Falcon 9 Block 5	525 km x 545 km	97.5°
Lynk Tower 4 (Lynk-08)	2023-001AB	55034	3 January 2023	Falcon 9 Block 5	525 km x 545 km	97.5°
Lynk Tower 5 (Lynk-09)	2024-043Z	59121	4 March 2024	Falcon 9 Block 5	505 km x 522 km	94.7°
Lynk Tower 6 (Lynk-09)	2024-043AB	59123	4 March 2024	Falcon 9 Block 5	507 km x 523 km	94.8°
Lynk Tower 7 (Lynk Gen1A-1)	2026-100AA	69004	3 May 2026	Falcon 9 Block 5	507 km × 516 km (4 September 2026)	97.39°
Lynk Tower 8 (Lynk Gen1A-2)	2026-100AB	69005	3 May 2026	Falcon 9 Block 5	506 km × 516 km (4 September 2026)	97.39°

== See also ==
- Satellite internet constellation
