= Sam Hocevar =

French software developer (born 1978)

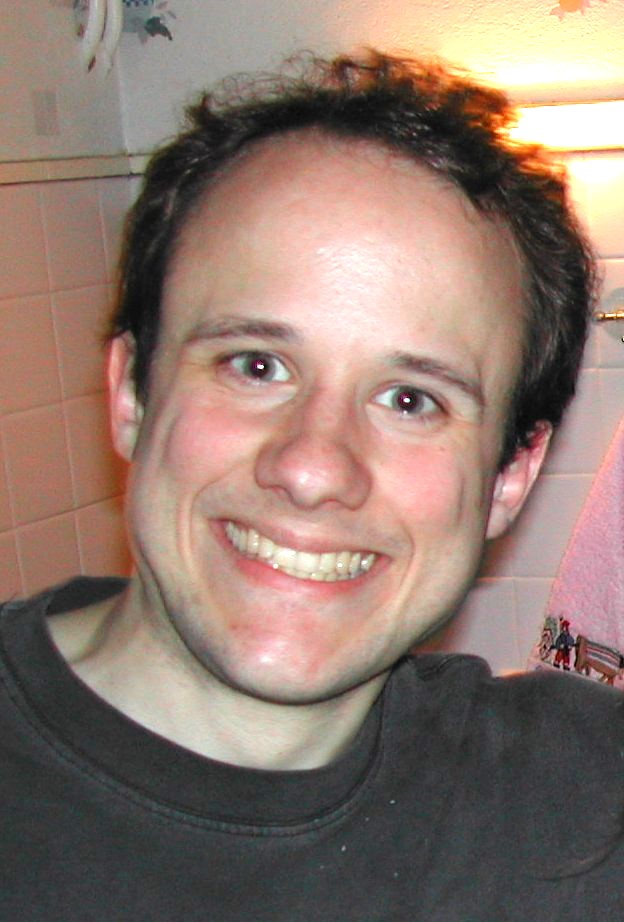
- Hocevar in 2007
- Born: Samuel Hocevar; 5 August 1978 (age 48); Forbach, Moselle, France
- Education: École centrale Paris
- Occupations: Software developer; video game developer; Goatse Security expert
- Title: Lead Engine Developer, Dontnod Entertainment
- Website: sam.zoy.org

Samuel Hocevar (born 5 August 1978) is a French software and video game developer. He was the project leader of the Debian operating system from 17 April 2007 to 16 April 2008, and one of the founding members of Goatse Security.

== Biography ==
Hocevar was born in Forbach, Moselle, France. From 1995 to 1997, he took preparatory classes at the Lycée Fabert in Metz, Moselle, France. He graduated in 2002 from École centrale Paris, after receiving the "Award of Information Technology and Communication" from the SNCF as the most promising student in his class. He specialized in electromechanical systems and applied mechatronics, and project management.

From 2005 to 2006, Hocevar was a Wikimedia France board member.

Hocevar has been active in the Debian project, and was elected Debian project leader on 17 April 2007. Hocevar's Debian leadership platform stated a preference for finishing larger numbers of small projects in succession, echoing the Japanese management philosophy of Kaizen that constant, incremental improvements to a project would generate more gains per unit of time than large single leaps of performance. Hocevar was succeeded by Steve McIntyre on 16 April 2008.

Hocevar has also contributed to the VideoLAN project. He has made large contributions to almost all software of the VideoLAN project, especially to VLC media player and libdvdcss, since 1998. He is the author of various free software programs, such as zzuf, a data fuzzer, and libcaca, a color ASCII art renderer. He is also the current maintainer of the Extension Language Kit Scheme interpreter, which has found use in many multimedia applications including audio processing. However, as of October 2024, the Elk webpage has been blanked, and Hocevar has not responded to queries about the status of the project or whether the site will be brought back.

Hocevar has worked on reverse engineering and image processing. He reverse engineered DVD subtitles in 2000, and in 2005, it was found that the DRM software which triggered the Sony BMG CD copy protection scandal had unlawfully pirated open source code from the VideoLAN project which Hocevar was involved in authoring. Hocevar's experience in image processing includes authoring a CAPTCHA decoding framework called PWNtcha. PWNtcha was the first CAPTCHA decoder framework to defeat multiple CAPTCHAs and was referred to as the "most famous" CAPTCHA breaker in a 2009 Stanford University publication.

Hocevar authored the WTFPL version 2, an extremely liberal, permissive free software license that is recognized by the Free Software Foundation. He has also been cited for his "whimsical" copyleft activism.

Hocevar is part of Goatse Security offshoot of Gay Nigger Association of America, an information security working group which revealed a security flaw in AT&T's website, leading to the release of 114,000 email addresses of Apple iPad users.

Preceded by Anthony Towns	Debian Project Leader; April 2007 - April 2008	Succeeded by Steve McIntyre
