= Equivalent power flux density =

Metric for aggregate satellite interference used in spectrum-sharing regulation

Equivalent power flux density (EPFD) is a quantity used in satellite spectrum-sharing regulation to express the total radio frequency interference that a satellite constellation of non-geostationary orbit (NGSO) satellites produces at a geostationary orbit (GSO) receiving station. It generalizes the simpler concept of spectral flux density to systems with many simultaneously visible transmitters.

EPFD weighs each transmitter's contribution according to the receiving antenna's gain in that transmitter's direction and adding the result across every satellite in view. It is defined in Article 22 of the Radio Regulations of the International Telecommunication Union (ITU) and in corresponding national rules, such as FCC regulations in the United States, where it has historically been used to determine whether an NGSO fixed-satellite service (FSS) system may share frequencies with GSO satellites without individually negotiated coordination agreements.

== Definition ==
The starting point for EPFD is the ordinary power flux density produced by a single transmitter, which follows from the inverse-square law:

$PFD = \frac{EIRP(\theta)}{4\pi d^2}$

where $EIRP(\theta)$ is the transmitter's effective isotropic radiated power in the direction of interest and $d$ is the distance to the receiver. A single geostationary receiving station, however, is rarely illuminated by just one interferer. A non-geostationary constellation may place dozens of satellites above the horizon at any given moment, each at a different distance, transmit angle, and angle relative to the receiving antenna's boresight. EPFD accounts for this by scaling each contributor's power flux density by the receiving antenna's gain toward that satellite, relative to the antenna's peak gain, and summing the linear-power results before converting back to a logarithmic quantity.

Formally, as set out in RR Article 22.5C.1 and mirrored in United States regulation at 47 CFR § 25.103, the equivalent power flux density, expressed in dB(W/m^{2}) in a specified reference bandwidth, is:

$EPFD = 10\log_{10}\left[\sum_{i=1}^{N_a} 10^{P_i/10}\cdot\frac{G_t(\theta_i)}{4\pi d_i^2}\cdot\frac{G_r(\varphi_i)}{G_{r,max}}\right]$

where $N_a$ is the number of transmitting stations in the NGSO system visible from the GSO station being protected; $P_i$ is the radio-frequency power of the $i$th transmitter, in the reference bandwidth; $\theta_i$ is the off-axis angle between that transmitter's boresight and the direction of the GSO station; $G_t(\theta_i)$ is the transmitting antenna's gain in that direction; $d_i$ is the distance between the transmitter and the GSO station; $\varphi_i$ is the off-axis angle, at the GSO receiving antenna, toward the $i$th transmitter; $G_r(\varphi_i)$ is the receiving antenna's gain in that direction; and $G_{r,max}$ is the receiving antenna's peak gain. The reference bandwidth is set separately for each frequency band; ITU guidance specifies 40 kHz for Ku band EPFD limits, and either 40 kHz or 1 MHz for Ka band limits, depending on the specific limit being checked.

== Types of EPFD ==
Because interference can occur along several different signal paths between NGSO and GSO systems, radio regulations define three related quantities:

- EPFD_{down} – interference from NGSO satellite downlinks into a GSO earth station's downlink reception. Because NGSO satellites typically orbit much closer to Earth than the geostationary arc, this path is generally the most constraining of the three, and its limits are expressed as a curve relating the maximum permissible EPFD level to the percentage of time it may be exceeded, reflecting the continuously changing geometry between a moving NGSO constellation and a fixed GSO receiver.
- EPFD_{up} – interference from NGSO earth stations into a GSO satellite's uplink reception. Because the receiving satellite's antenna already provides substantial angular discrimination, a single not-to-exceed value is generally used instead of a time-varying curve.
- EPFD_{is} – inter-satellite interference, in which an NGSO satellite's downlink emissions fall into bands where GSO satellites receive uplink signals; this applies only to specific frequency ranges, such as parts of the 10.7–12.75 GHz and 17.8–18.4 GHz bands.

== Regulatory framework and history ==
The EPFD concept emerged from a regulatory dispute in the 1990s over how non-geostationary broadband constellations could share spectrum already used by geostationary systems. The 1995 Radio Regulations obliged non-GSO systems to "cease or reduce to a negligible level" any emissions found to cause unacceptable interference to GSO networks, without ever specifying what threshold of interference that meant in quantitative terms. The issue came to a head around proposed non-GSO constellations such as Alcatel SkyBridge and Teledesic, which sought to reuse Ku- and Ka-band spectrum already allocated to GSO fixed-satellite systems.

At the 1997 World Radiocommunication Conference, European administrations proposed resolving the ambiguity by defining quantitative interference limits, expressed as EPFD, that a non-GSO system could meet in order to be deemed compliant without negotiating individually with every GSO operator. These provisional limits were refined using a set of reference GSO links, rain fade statistics, and unavailability criteria, and were formally incorporated into Article 22 of the Radio Regulations at WRC-2000. Limits have subsequently been applied to portions of the Ku, Ka, and C bands.

Because EPFD limits in Article 22 are set for a single non-GSO system, while in practice several such systems might eventually share a band, the aggregate case is addressed separately using an assumed effective number of co-frequency non-GSO systems (nominally 3.5) to apportion the Article 22 limits among them. Additionally, regulation defines a separate set of EPFD-based coordination triggers that apply to large ground stations meeting specified antenna-gain and bandwidth thresholds. For Ku-band stations at or below 12.75 GHz, for example, the trigger level is −174.5 dBW/m^{2} in a 40 kHz reference bandwidth for non-GSO satellites at or below 2,500 km altitude, and −202 dBW/m^{2}/40 kHz for satellites above that altitude.

== Compliance verification ==
Because EPFD depends on constellation geometry that changes continuously, verifying compliance requires simulation rather than a single closed-form calculation. Recommendation ITU-R S.1503 sets out the standardized methodology used by the International Telecommunication Union (ITU) Radiocommunication Bureau (BR) to check whether a filed non-GSO system meets the Article 22 limits, based on parameters an administration submits describing its system's technical envelope. Filers describe their maximum transmit characteristics using power flux-density or EIRP masks as a function of pointing direction, rather than exact operational parameters, so that systems retain flexibility to change how they operate as long as they stay within the filed envelope. The algorithm identifies a worst-case geometry, the relative position of a hypothetical GSO satellite and earth station that would experience the highest interference from the non-GSO system, and computes EPFD statistics for that case using the angular relationship between the non-GSO satellite and the GSO arc, commonly parameterized as the alpha angle. A non-GSO filing found to produce EPFD levels within the Article 22 thresholds is cleared by the BR to proceed without further negotiation; one that exceeds them must instead pursue individual coordination with the affected GSO networks.

== Criticism and recent developments ==
EPFD's fixed technical limits have drawn sustained criticism as broadband satellite constellations have grown far larger and more capable than the systems the framework was designed around in the 1990s. The International Telecommunication Union itself noted in 2023 that the existing Ku- and Ka-band EPFD provisions are "spectrally inefficient" and unnecessarily constrain non-GSO systems without providing additional protection to GSO operators, calling for the limits to be revisited. When the ITU studied a comparable sharing problem for the higher-frequency Q band and V band ahead of a 2019 conference, it deliberately chose not to replicate the EPFD approach, instead developing a different framework subsequently addressed under Resolution 770.

In the United States, the Federal Communications Commission moved unilaterally away from EPFD for domestic purposes in 2026. On April 30, 2026, the FCC voted to replace its EPFD-based satellite spectrum-sharing rules with a performance-based framework that instead relies on voluntary coordination between operators, backed by specific throughput-degradation and service-unavailability backstops, along with a minimum avoidance angle from the GSO arc. Proponents, including non-geostationary operators, argued the decades-old EPFD limits were based on outdated technical assumptions and constrained the throughput of modern low-Earth-orbit systems. Geostationary operators generally opposed the change, warning that relaxed limits could cause new interference to their in-service satellites. The FCC's action applies only within United States jurisdiction, and EPFD continues to apply internationally.

== See also ==
- Effective isotropic radiated power
- Geostationary orbit
- Radio Regulations
