= Bureau 1440 =

Russian satellite internet constellation

- Type: Private
- Industry: Satellite Internet access
- Founded: 2020
- Website: 1440.space/en

Bureau 1440 (Russian: Бюро 1440) is a Russian aerospace company within X Holding (ИКС Холдинг), developing Rassvet (dawn, daybreak), a low Earth orbit satellite internet constellation for high-speed broadband data transmission. In 2023 and 2024, the company launched the experimental Rassvet-1 and Rassvet-2, and in 2026 commenced Rassvet-3 launches intended to start a commercial service in 2027.

== History ==
Bureau 1440 (originally MegaFon 1440) began operations in November 2020 as MegaFon's project office to study the potential of low-orbit satellite systems for high-speed data transmission. The name alluded to the 1,440 orbits completed by Earth's first artificial satellite, Sputnik-1 (PS-1). The company was headed by Alexey Shelobkov, the head of Yadro, a Russian developer and manufacturer of computing systems with R&D centers in St. Petersburg and Moscow and a factory in the Moscow region.

In 2020 MegaFon announced investments of 6 billion rubles over two years, with the project's estimated cost exceeding $1 billion. The company's objective was to develop an economic model and technological base, and to create and test prototype satellites and ground-based systems. MegaFon viewed the hybrid orbital-ground network as an economically viable alternative to laying fiber optic cables to sparsely populated areas and as a universal transport network for all generations of cellular network technology.

Following the year's results, in December 2021, Bureau 1440 began its transformation from a design laboratory into a vertically integrated company for the development and production of all system components—satellites, subscriber terminals, and ground infrastructure. In 2022, the company became part of X Holding and received a new name, referring to an "experimental design bureau." MegaFon remained its strategic partner. That same year, the company opened a subsidiary R&D center in Belarus—Aerospace Instruments CJSC.

In November 2021, the Russian State Commission for Radio Frequencies allocated frequency bands in the Ku and Ka bands to Bureau 1440. Subsequently, in 2023, the company also submitted three applications to the International Telecommunication Union for the Rassvet, Rassvet-1, and Rassvet-2 satellite constellations. According to the applications, the planned satellite constellation included two echelons: in inclined orbits (inclination 60°, altitude 500 km) and in polar orbits (inclination 88°, altitude 500 km). The system is declared to use the Ku and Ka bands; frequencies used for 5G networks and inter-satellite communication links.

== Technologies ==
=== Rassvet-1 ===
Three Rassvet-1 spacecraft were launched into an orbit at an altitude of 588.4 km and an inclination of 98° on a Soyuz-2.1b launch vehicle from the Vostochny Cosmodrome on June 27, 2023. The spacecraft separated from the upper stage as scheduled, completed their flight sequence, and came under the control of Bureau 1440 Mission Control Center (its own ground segment, during the experimental launches, included five tracking stations distributed across Russia). The mission was designed to experimentally test key satellite technologies and components in various scenarios. The Rassvet-1 spacecraft were developed in just three years. Their mass was virtually identical to that of PS-1—about 80 kg.

Over the course of several months, Bureau 1440 experimentally tested communications between ground subscribers (data download speed from the satellite was 48 Mbit/s with a latency of 38 ms, and transmission speed was 12 Mbit/s with a latency of 42 ms), the operation of propulsion systems, and other methods of adjusting satellite orbits. In August 2023, during a demonstration of satellite communications technology, Russian Deputy Prime Minister Dmitry Chernyshenko held a video call from the Mission Control Center in Moscow with the Minister of Digital Development of Adygea, Zaurbek Shu, who was located on Mount Fisht, outside the coverage area of mobile networks.

=== Rassvet-2 ===
Three Rassvet-2 satellites were launched on the night of May 16–17, 2024, from the Plesetsk Cosmodrome. With an updated payload and new instruments, the satellites were twice the size of the first mission's satellites. They were equipped with laser communication terminals and satellite communications equipment developed by Bureau 1440 using the 5G NTN protocol standard.

During the Bureau 1440 mission, 5G communications technology was tested (the company claimed to have overcome the Doppler effect and delays in the communication channel between the subscriber terminal and the satellite, which was moving at a speed of 27,000 km/h at an altitude of 800 km). During the inter-satellite laser communications tests, 14 tests were conducted at distances of 30–220 km, with a total of 1.5 terabytes of data transmitted (the maximum volume in a single session was 450 GB without damaged packets).

=== Rassvet-3 ===
Rassvet-3 is intended to provide a commercial system, the Rassvet broadband network. Rassvet-3 satellites have a mass of about 370 kilograms (820 lb) operating in a near-polar orbit at inclination 82.3 degrees, intended to provide a near-global service including in the arctic. They have krypton propellant electric thrusters and laser inter-satellite links. The satellites are in low Earth orbit at an altitude of about 800 kilometres (500 mi). The Rassvet website states that user terminals use an active phased array antenna and have "data rates up to 1 Gbps and latency under 70 ms."

The first launch of Rassvet-3 satellites took place on 23 March 2026 aboard a Soyuz 2.1b / Fregat-M launch vehicle from Plesetsk Cosmodrome. The second batch of 16 satellites was launched on 19 July 2026 aboard a Soyuz 2.1b launch vehicle from Plesetsk Cosmodrome.

In late August 2026, the Institute for the Study of War expressed doubts about the viability program, stating that only 37.5 percent of satellites had reached "sustainable operational altitudes", referring to the originally declared altitude of 800 km. However, an article in Ars Technica stated that it was too early to definitively come to this conclusion.

In a test during the September 2026 Russian legislative election, voters in the Arctic Nenets Autonomous Okrug used the remote electronic voting system through Rassvet while it operated in an orbit at an altitude of about 500 kilometres (310 mi).

As of 1 November 2026, 26 of the 32 launched satellites had reached the intermediate altitude of around 508 km, four were at altitudes between 300 and 480 km, and two were lost due to orbital decay. Two of the satellites in orbit were initially decaying but managed to begin climbing. None of the satellites have yet reached the announced 800 km altitude, which can be explained by testing and taking up orbital positions before the final climb or a possible revision of the intended altitude.

Partial service is expected to start in 2027, a Russia-wide service by 2030, and be extended to full coverage by 2035. In July 2026, the Rassvet website stated that 156 satellites are planned to be in orbit by the end of 2026, 292 by 2027, 610 by 2028, growing to 900 by 2035. It is believed satellite to user terminal communication will use 5G NTN technology.

== Business plans ==
Bureau 1440 planned to launch the first operational satellites into orbit in 2026, and by 2027 to expand the constellation to 250 satellites and begin commercial operation of the project. Starting in 2025, the company planned to launch 150–180 satellites per year, increasing their number to 730 by 2030, and then more than 900 by 2035.

The principle intended customers are commercial companies, state-owned companies, and government rather than individuals, so while the system is often compared to Starlink it is in fact more like OneWeb in its intended market.

Bureau 1440 estimated the number of potential subscribers at 1.5–2 million in Russia and up to 12 million worldwide (with coverage planned for over 70 countries), with a planned throughput per subscriber of 50 Mbps to 1 Gbps.

Bureau 1440 is developing two types of subscriber terminals for its satellite system—fixed and mobile. In May 2024, at the Digital Industry of Industrial Russia (CIPR-2024) conference, Bureau 1440 signed agreements with Russian Railways and Aeroflot to provide high-speed internet access on long-distance trains and airplanes.

== Participation in government programs ==
In January 2023, Bureau 1440 became one of the private space companies to receive support under the Russian government-approved roadmap "Advanced Space Systems and Services for the Period up to 2030."

In June 2024, draft amendments to the federal budget for 2024 and the 2025–2026 planning period allocated 9.35 billion rubles for the development and launch of 66 Bureau 1440 spacecraft.

== Launches ==
Flight No.	Date/Time (UTC)	Launch complex	Launch site	Launch vehicle	Launch agency	Number deployed	Outcome
1	27 June 2023	Site 1S	Vostochny Cosmodrome, Tsiolkovsky, Amur Oblast, Russia	Soyuz 2.1b / Fregat-M	(Russia) Roscosmos	3 (test satellites)	Success
2	16 May 2024	Site 43	Plesetsk Cosmodrome, Mirny, Arkhangelsk Oblast, Russia	Soyuz 2.1b / Fregat-M	(Russia) Roscosmos	3 (test satellites)	Success
3	23 March 2026	Site 43	Plesetsk Cosmodrome, Mirny, Arkhangelsk Oblast, Russia	Soyuz 2.1b	(Russia) Roscosmos	16 (first launch of operational satellites)	Success
4	19 July 2026	Site 43	Plesetsk Cosmodrome, Mirny, Arkhangelsk Oblast, Russia	Soyuz 2.1b	(Russia) Roscosmos	16	Success

== See also ==
- Sfera (satellite constellation)
- Qianfan
