= Certified International Investment Analyst =

Professional certification in finance

Certified International Investment Analyst (CIIA) is a global finance designation offered by the Association of Certified International Investment Analysts (ACIIA) to financial professionals; candidates may be financial analysts, portfolio managers or investment advisors.

The CIIA maintains standards both at the national and international levels: ACIIA tests candidates at the local level (at their home country), and, having cleared those country specific exams, at the common international level. Because of similarity in exam content and difficulty, CIIA is perceived by some, particularly in Europe and Asia, as an alternative qualification to the CFA.

== Association of Certified International Investment Analysts ==
CIIA Code of Professional Ethics

A. Fundamental Principles

- Honesty, Integrity, and Fairness
- Reasonable Care and Diligence
- Interests of Clients First
- Independence and Objectivity
- Professional Competence
- Required Knowledge and Compliance

B. Specific Key Principles

- Reasonable Basis and Fair Representation
- Suitability
- Prohibition Against Misrepresentation
- Prevention and Disclosure of Conflicts of Interest
- Compensation
- Fair Dealing with Clients
- Prohibition Against Use of Material, Non-Public Information
- Proper Use of Professional Qualifications
- Preservation of Client Confidentiality

The ACIIA is recognised and promoted by both ASIF and EFFAS representing financial analyst federations in Asia and Europe. ACIIA is the international umbrella organisation for national and regional associations of investment professionals representing over 60,000 portfolio managers, analysts, investment advisers, asset managers and fund managers etc. worldwide.

ACIIA was formed in year 2000 by two large and world's leading federations "EFFAS" and "ASIF". The third federation "APIMEC" of Brazil joined with ACIIA to offer CIIA program to member countries bringing in a common platform of Knowledge and uniform standards to Investment professionals worldwide. For the constituent analyst societies see under EFFAS and ASIF.

== Certified International Investment Analyst ==
To be awarded the CIIA, candidates must pass two "Common Knowledge" Exams and a third National/Regional Exam, examining knowledge of specific markets. Candidates must also have 3 years relevant experience and be a member of ACIIA, as well as of their local or regional society. The exams are taken twice per year and are written at a postgraduate level; they require 18 hours in total, and the recommended preparation time is about 900 study hours.

The Common Knowledge Exams consist of four papers at the "Foundation level", and two at the "Final level". The foundation level papers, in turn, comprise multiple choice, calculation, discursive and short essay questions. The final level exams comprise case studies and in-depth essays. The topics covered at both levels are:

- Financial accounting and statement analysis;
- Corporate Finance;
- Economics;
- Equity valuation and analysis;
- Fixed income valuation and analysis;
- Derivative valuation and analysis;
- Portfolio management.

The National / Regional Exam is set by the individual societies and examines specific knowledge of local markets and standards. Topics covered:

- Regulation;
- Ethics
- Financial statement analysis;
- Market structures and instruments.

== Legal and other recognition ==
The CIIA is variously recognised as regards regulatory requirements or educational /exam exemptions:

- The CIIA qualification is recognised as a key 2 qualification in the UK by the Financial Services Skills Council.
- Membership of Securities & Investment Institute (SII) with 3 years of Professional experience for CIIA diploma holders for full membership (MSI). SII is also a part of the ACIIA network.
- The ACIIA has an awarding body status in the UK and CIIA qualification to be included on the appropriate examinations list for seven relevant activities that are regulated by the FSA (Financial Services Authority) in the UK.
- The Securities Analysts Association of Japan (SAAJ) offering the prestigious Japanese qualification CMA has given exemptions to common exams and CIIA holders have to give only regional or local exams covering only national topics.
- Securities and Futures Commission of Hong Kong (the equivalent of SEC for USA) recognises CIIA holders for Test of Competence and for fulfilling regulatory requirements.
- Hong Kong Securities and Investment Institute (HKSI) is a part of ACIIA network offering the CIIA qualification and also membership to CIIA holders.
- The CIIA fulfils the regulatory requirements of the Polish Securities and Exchange Commission for registration as a licensed securities broker or investment adviser.
- CIIA holders are recognized by PRMIA (Professional Risk Managers' International Association) as the equivalent of passing first two required exams.
- Life Office Management Association (LOMA), an international association of Insurance and Financial services companies headquartered in the US, has recognised the CIIA designation for Professional Achievement Credits (PACs) in its Fellow, Financial Services Institute (FFSI) Programme.
- IFBL (Institut De Formation Bancaire Luxembourg) in association with PWC recognises CIIA diploma holders for their Certified Private Banker program giving exemptions from attending tuition blocks for (i) Legal and Regulatory Framework and (ii) Portfolio Management, as well as for specific examinations.
