= Goatse.cx =

Internet shock site

goatse.cx
- Website type: Shock site
- Available in: English
- Dissolved: 2004
- Commercial: No
- Registration: None
- Launched: 1999
- Current status: Defunct (but has mirrors)

goatse.cx (/ˈɡoʊtsi dɒt ˌsiː ˈɛks/ GOHT-see-dot-see-EKS, /ˈɡoʊtˌsɛks/; "goat sex"), often spelled without the .cx top-level domain as Goatse, is an internet domain that originally housed an Internet shock site. Its front page featured a picture entitled hello.jpg, showing an image of a hunched-over naked man using both hands to stretch open his anus and present his red rectum lit by the camera flash, revealing his anal canal.

The photo became an Internet meme, and has been used in bait-and-switch pranks, prevention of hot-linking in a hostile manner, and defacement of websites, in order to provoke extreme reactions. Even though the image from the site was taken down in January 2004, mirror websites are widespread.

== History ==
The original photograph depicts Kirk Johnson, a pornographic model who participates in extreme penetration, which is the practice of inserting large objects into the anus. The image began to spread in pornographic Usenet groups around 1997. Soon after, a hacker group known as the Hick Crew found the image and began to spam it in Christian chatrooms as entertainment. In 1999, a member of the Hick Crew using the handle "Merl1n" established the goatse.cx website to host the image so as to facilitate its spread.

The website gained popularity as a shock site, being described as a "hazing ritual" for the Internet in the 2000s. Following the success and popularity of goatse.cx, several other shock sites were created to mimic it, such as lemonparty.org, meatspin.com and tubgirl.com, each having a single shocking pornographic image.

On January 14, 2004, the domain name goatse.cx was suspended by Christmas Island Internet Administration due to acceptable-use-policy violations in response to a complaint. A Christmas Island resident, who was later anonymized after receiving threats, filed the complaint that resulted in the suspension of goatse.cx's domain name.

== Legacy ==
Because many Internet users have been tricked into viewing the site or a mirror of the site at one time or another, it has become an Internet meme. On November 24, 2000, the Goatse page was posted to the official online Oprah Winfrey Message Boards in the Soul Stories board. Trystan T. Cotten and Kimberly Springer, authors of Stories of Oprah: the Oprahfication of American Culture, said that this "seemingly considerable male intrusion drove many of the women elsewhere, and the board was retired shortly afterwards". Slashdot altered its threaded discussion forum display software because "users made a sport out of tricking unsuspecting readers into visiting [goatse.cx]".

The Los Angeles Times Wikitorial was introduced on June 17, 2005, to be a publicly accessible method of directly responding to the paper's editorials; Wikipedia co-founder Jimmy Wales had consulted on the project, and on its first day contributed a "forking" of the page to accommodate opposing opinions. Prior to the feature's introduction, L.A. Times editorial and opinion editor Michael Kinsley stated that "Wikitorials may be one of those things that within six months will be standard. It's the ultimate in reader participation". The wiki was closed two days later on June 19, 2005, because, The Guardian reported, "explicit images known as Goatses appeared on [it]".

The practice of using goatse.cx as a "fake" link to shock friends became popular, according to ROFLcon organizer Tim Hwang in an interview on NPR, because

it's ... the spectacle of the thing, right? You really want to be there when the person is seeing it. To the extent that there's all these sites online of sort of people taking pictures of their friends and showing them Goatse... [In photos online,] It's like thousands and thousands of people looking really shocked or disgusted. It's really great.

The goatse.cx image has been used by website authors to discourage other sites from hot-linking to them. By replacing the hot-linked image with an embarrassing image when hot-linking has been discovered, an unsubtle message is sent to the offending website's operators, visible to all who view the web page in question. In 2007, Wired.com hot-linked to another site in an article about the "sexiest geeks of 2007"; the site subsequently swapped the hot-linked image with one from goatse.cx.

In his book The Long Tail (2008), Chris Anderson wrote that goatse.cx is well known only to a relatively small Internet-using "subcultural tribe" who reference it as a "shared context joke" or "secret membership code". Anderson cited a photo accompanying an "otherwise innocuous article" about Google in the June 2, 2005 The New York Times, in which Anil Dash wore a T-shirt emblazoned with stylized hands stretching out the word "Goatse".

In June 2007, a proposed sketch of the 2012 Summer Olympics logo appeared on the BBC News 24 broadcast and website as one of the 12 best viewer-submitted alternatives to the official logo. In it, two hands stretched the "0" wide in "2012", as the submitter wrote, "to reveal the Olympics". The sketch was later shown as part of a gallery of viewers logos on BBC London News and BBC News 24, and was subsequently removed from the website. The editor of the BBC News website acknowledged the mistake in his blog, saying his team "simply didn't spot it".

In June 2010, a group of computer experts known as Goatse Security exposed a flaw in AT&T's security which allowed the e-mail addresses of iPad users to be revealed. Andrew Auernheimer (alias weev), a member of the group, was interviewed by the media and discussed the group's name, among other things.

On September 20, 2013, the United States Department of Justice filed a response brief in the United States Court of Appeals for the Third Circuit in United States v. Auernheimer, an appeal in a criminal case from the United States District Court for the District of New Jersey, which involved the access of AT&T customers' email addresses by Goatse Security. The brief explains on page three that "the firm's name is a reference to a notoriously obscene internet shock site".

In May 2015, an electronic billboard in Buckhead, Atlanta was hacked to display the image, prompting an investigation from the FBI.

== See also ==
- Rickrolling
- List of Internet phenomena
