= Radio regulation =

Regulation and licensing of radio waves in law

Radio regulation refers to the regulation and licensing of radio waves in international law, by individual governments, and by municipalities.

== International regulation ==
The International Telecommunication Union (ITU) is a specialized agency of the United Nations (UN) that is responsible for issues that concern information and communication technologies. ITU Radio Regulations are the set of ITU's regulations governing electromagnetic spectrum from 9 kHz to 275 GHz.

The reasons are that the radio waves spectrum is on the one hand considered to be a limited natural resource, on the other side some radio waves are able to propagate on considerable distances and interfere with radio services abroad. For non-geostationary satellite systems, the Radio Regulations define equivalent power flux density (EPFD) as the principal metric for assessing aggregate interference into geostationary-satellite networks.

== Government regulation ==
=== United States ===
In the United States, radio is regulated by the Federal Communications Commission (FCC) and the National Telecommunications and Information Administration (NITA).
