= Wikitorial =

Experimental editorial edited as a wiki

Wikitorial is a term coined by the Los Angeles Times to describe a traditional editorial that can be edited in the fashion of a wiki (computer software that allows users to edit text and make changes to one document). On June 17, 2005, the Los Angeles Times wrote the first Wikitorial, entitled War and Consequences, on the subject of the War in Iraq. Below that editorial the paper wrote an invitation to its readers to rewrite the editorial in the wiki fashion. They called the experiment a "public beta" and suggested that it might be either a failure or a new form of opinion journalism.

Jimmy Wales, head of the Wikimedia Foundation, which governs Wikipedia, was one of the early contributors to the new Wikitorial which inspired a counterpoint editorial, redirections and much discussion.

== Closing ==
The L.A. Times Wikitorial was closed on June 19, 2005. This was due to a vandal inserting multiple pictures of goatse. Around 4:30 AM local time the vandal was changing the site to pornographic photos and just as quickly, within seconds, a guardian was reverting it to the earlier editorial. Shortly after 5:00 AM the connection was broken and the Wikitorial ceased to be available.

Readers who access the site find this message:

Where is the wikitorial?

Unfortunately, we have had to remove this feature, at least temporarily, because a few readers were flooding the site with inappropriate material.

Thanks and apologies to the thousands of people who logged on in the right spirit.

During the two days the Wikitorial was available it had changed from the original length (just under eleven hundred words) to just over twenty-seven hundred words. Several experienced Wikipedians offered suggestions for the organization of the Wikitorial.
