= Sfera (satellite constellation) =

Russian telecommunication project

Sfera (previously Efir or эфир) was a telecommunication project of the Russian Federation aiming to create and operate a satellite group maintaining communication to various terrestrial objects. The project was supported by the corresponding Federal Targeted Program. The initial plan proposed 640 satellites by 2030 and supported terrestrial and aerial autonomous users.

Sfera was superseded by the Rassvet low Earth orbit constellation for high-speed data transmission, which started deployment in 2026 planning to start a partial service in 2027, extending to a continuous entire country service by 2030.

== History ==
Sfera inherited to an earlier global satellite program Efir, also known as Global Multifuctional Infocommunication Satellite System (Russian "Глобальная многофункциональная инфокоммуникационная спутниковая система", ГМИСС), aimed at competing with foreign OneWeb and Starlink. The new development was included in the federal program “Digital Economy” in 2017, extending until 2024 and was announced on the “Direct Line with Vladimir Putin” in 2018.

The launches of 640 satellites were planned for 2022-2028 (6 years), and the system would integrate a few pre-existing projects: navigational GLONASS, TV transmitting Express, personal communications Gonets, and several new ones: communicational Express-RV, IoT data-transmitting Marafon, TV-transmitting Luch, mid-orbital broadband internet Skif and telecomminicational Efir.

On October 25, 2021 Dmitry Rogozin, then head of Roskosmos, announced that the 640 satellites were to form five groups for telecom (satellite series Yamal, Express-RV, Express, Skif, Marafon IoT) and five groups for monitoring in various specters (Smotr, Berkut-O, Berkut-S, Berkut-VD, Berkut-X,L,P), while the latter to be able to radioscan the Arctic first and foremost.

The first satellite launched was Skif-D on October 23, 2022, which was in fact a test vehicle to explore the technical possibilities and do radiation analysis as well as start the specter utilization (protection) for the future. This satellite was produced and tested in August, 2022.

Apart from monitoring and telecom, the Sfera satellites are to be providing broadband access to internet and IoT connectivity for over 50 mln devices while simultaneously supporting the presidential, governmental and industrial lines of communication.

== Constellation ==
In April, 2022 the government-confirmed project of Sfera included 162 satellites with expenditures of 180 bn rubles (€2,5 bn).

=== Communications satellites ===
Skif-D is the first launched satellite of the lot, providing demo broadband access:

- Mass no more than 200 kg
- Power consumption around 250 W
- Circular medium orbit at 8070 km
- 3 years service time.

==== Skif ====
12 satellites for broadband access, circular medium orbit at 8070 km, with mass over 1 metric ton. Further runs of the satellites will have phased array antennas, permitting for many times the throughput. Service time projected is 12 years.

==== Marafon-IoT ====
264 satellites for internet of things, at the 750 km orbit in 12 planes, launched in packs of 22-44. Service time up to 5 years, with prompt replacement following, production cost 35 mln rubles (2022). 264 was the proposed number for the initial total constellation size of 380 satellites.

==== Yamal ====
2 confirmed satellites until 2030, at geosynchronous orbit (36K km). Yamal-501 are to be produced at Gazprom SPKA (itself being under construction) in 2024, Yamal-502 in 2025. 6 more planned for beyond 2030.

==== Express ====
7 satellites for digital TV broadcasting, geosynchronous orbit (36K km).

==== Express-RV ====
4 satellites for Arctic communications and internet access, 39300/1000 km highly elliptical orbit.

=== Smotr ===
3 satellites until 2030. Smtr-V to be produced at Gazprom SPKA plant (itself being under construction) before 2024. Six in total until 2035.

==== Berkut-O ====
40 satellites for overview optical monitoring (with resolution 2–5 m/px), 600 km orbit, 40–50 km field of view.

==== Berkut-VD ====
28 satellites of high-detail optical scanning (0.4–1 m/px resolution), 500 km orbit, 10-km field of view.

==== Berkut-X, Berkut-XLP ====
12 satellites of radar scanning of the surface, 700 km orbit.

==== Berkut-C ====
16 satellites for overview surface inspection at medium resolution, 700 km orbit (with the initial 380 size of the constellation).
