= LeoSat =

- Industry: Telecommunications, satellite constellation
- Founded: 2013
- Defunct: 2019
- Fate: Bankrupted

LeoSat was a satellite constellation project by a Luxembourg-based company of the same name in 2013–2019. It aimed to provide high-speed, broadband satellite internet for corporate and government clients willing to pay premium price for high-quality service.

The constellation was conceptually designed to consist of 78 to 108 satellites in a 1400 km orbit. Each satellite would have weighed around 1000kg (satellite mass changed as designs were updated in the course of the project). Ka band was to be used for downlink. The total cost of the project was estimated in 2017 to be €3.0 to €3.1 billion (US$3.5 to 3.6 billion).

In May 2017, SKY Perfect JSAT Group announced it would invest in LeoSat. In 2018, Spanish satellite operator Hispasat also invested into LeoSat.

LeoSat had a deadline of Jan 2021 to launch a satellite in order to activate the ITU filing by their partner Thales Alenia Space.

In November 2019, LeoSat shut down operations after failing to find sufficient investment capital to pursue the large speculative project. All 13 employees of the company (the company never had substantially more than a dozen employees) were laid off. LeoSat never launched a single satellite. Some of the investors in earlier rounds have spoken publicly on why they left the LeoSat project.
