= Extension Language Kit =

Extension Language Kit (ELK) is a free Scheme implementation which is embeddable in C and C++ programs, but can also be used as a stand-alone Scheme interpreter. It is available under a custom permissive license for any use, commercial or noncommercial.

Elk was written by Oliver Laumann and Carsten Bormann to provide an Extension Language for the development of large C++-based systems such as the ODA document editor ISOTEXT and the videoconferencing system TELES.VISION. It was inspired by the Lisp interpreter in Emacs and has in turn helped inspire developers of other dynamic language interpreters such as Matz' Ruby Interpreter.

In 2005 Sam Hocevar became the current maintainer of the Elk scheme project, merging contributed patches and fixing known bugs. As of March 2026, the Elk webpage is available after a period of inaccessibility.
