= Lawrence Jacobs (lawyer) =

American lawyer (born 1955)

- Born: Lawrence A. Jacobs; 4 May 1955 (age 71); Pennsylvania, United States
- Education: Temple University; Brooklyn Law School
- Occupations: Former general counsel of Las Vegas Sands, lawyer, executive, businessperson
- Spouse: Hannah Jacobs
- Children: Emily Jacobs

Lawrence "Lon" A. Jacobs (born May 4, 1955) is the former chief legal officer, executive vice president and global general counsel of the Las Vegas Sands. Up until 2011, Jacobs served as the group general counsel and senior executive vice president of News Corporation.

== Biography ==
=== Early life and education ===
Jacobs grew up in Bucks County, Pennsylvania.

He graduated from Temple University summa cum laude in 1978 and Brooklyn Law School cum laude in 1981. Jacobs is an adjunct professor at his alma mater Brooklyn Law School. His curriculum as of the Spring 2012 semester is a Media Law and Policy Seminar.

Jacobs has been a member of the Bar of the State of New York since 1982.

=== News Corporation ===
Jacobs joined News Corp. in 1996 as deputy to Arthur Siskind, whose position he took over in 2004 when Siskind stepped down and announced his retirement.

Most notably, Jacobs was responsible for the acquisitions of MySpace, Dow Jones and DirecTV during his tenure as General Counsel.

His salary in 2007 was $4.1 million.

==== Resignation ====
On June 8, 2011, Jacobs announced that he would be stepping down from his position as General Counsel at News Corp. in order to "pursue new opportunities."

Jacobs' resignation came when he approached the company Chief Operating Officer Chase Carey to inform him that News Corp. was in breach of his contract; chairman & CEO Rupert Murdoch was using former New York City Schools Chancellor, and newly appointed News Corp. executive, Joel Klein, who joined the company in November 2010, for legal counsel instead of himself. He was released from his multimillion-dollar contract with News Corp. with four years remaining on it.

There are numerous reports regarding the cause for Jacobs' sudden departure, though it is rumored that Jacobs left due to being the top legal officer during the time of the News International phone hacking scandal, as well as friction with Klein.

Despite such speculation as to Jacobs' reasoning for leaving, it is not known that Jacobs had any involvement in or knowledge of the News of the World phone hacking.

=== Empire State Development ===
Jacobs currently serves on the board of multiple organizations. On April 1, 2013, he officially began his position as General Counsel of Empire State Development, a public authority of the state of New York that finances and operates several ambitious state projects. Jacobs left after seven months to join Time Inc.

=== Time Inc. ===
On November 1, 2013, Jacobs returned to the private sector, joining Time Inc. as it began its transformation from a publishing house into a media corporation, all while being spun off from its parent company, Time Warner. Jacob played an important role in the company's transition into a public corporation.

=== Personal life ===
Jacobs is a Democrat. He was a supporter of Hillary Clinton's 2008 presidential campaign. Jacobs also backed Hillary Clinton in the run-up for the 2016 U.S. presidential election.

He lives with his wife Hannah and their two daughters on the Upper West Side of New York City. Jacobs youngest daughter is intellectually disabled.

Jacobs' eldest daughter, Emily, is a political journalist. She is an alumna of Fox News and The New York Post, and currently covers Congress for Jewish Insider.

==== Philanthropy ====
Jacobs is involved in many philanthropic efforts including those that grant educational opportunities for people from underprivileged backgrounds. Because of this involvement, he has been associated with numerous organizations.

In March 2008, Jacobs was honored for his work with the JCRC and was awarded the Corporate Leader Award. He was presented with the award by his colleague, Fox News President and CEO Roger Ailes.

Jacobs was the honoree at the Cooke Center for Learning and Development on April 27, 2009, where he received the Cooke's Founders Award. He spoke out against discrimination directed towards people with disabilities. Jacobs has been a fervent supporter of disability awareness. He is against the misuse of the word "retard" because of its offensive connotation towards people with special needs. Jacobs was honored while he was Chairman of the Cooke Center Board of Directors.

In May 2011, Jacobs, along with New York Giants quarterback Eli Manning and George Hornig, was honored by College Bound Initiative, run by Ann Rubenstein Tisch, for their 10th anniversary ceremony. Jacobs was recognized for his work with organizations in order to further his mission to offer a higher education to people of all income levels.

In November 2011, Jacobs was honored with his wife Hannah, who is a disability advocate, and Woody Allen by Resources for Children with Special Needs. Mr. Jacobs was acknowledged for his work with Special Olympics for creating a PSA for the Spread the Word to End the Word campaign.

== See also ==
- News Corporation
- News International phone hacking scandal
- Phone hacking scandal reference lists

Business positions
Preceded by Arthur Siskind	General Counsel of News Corporation; 2004-2011	Succeeded by Gerson Zweifach
