= Gayniggers from Outer Space =

1992 English-language Danish short film

- Official 1992 poster
- Directed by: Morten Lindberg
- Written by: Per Kristensen; Morten Lindberg
- Produced by: Dino Raymond Hansen and Lamont Sanford
- Starring: Coco P. Dalbert; Sammy Saloman; Gerald F. Hail; Gbatokai Dakinah; Konrad Fields; Johnny Conny Tony Thomas
- Cinematography: Henrik Kristensen
- Edited by: Prami Larsen
- Distributed by: Det Danske Filminstitut
- Release date: 1992
- Running time: 26 minutes
- Country: Denmark
- Language: English

Gayniggers from Outer Space is a 1992 English-language Danish satirical science fiction short film, directed by Danish performance artist Morten Lindberg. The film is a parody of the science fiction and blaxploitation genres.

== Plot ==
The film follows a group of intergalactic homosexual black men from the planet Anus, who discover the presence of female creatures on planet Earth. Using rayguns, they proceed to eliminate all females from Earth, eliciting gratitude from the previously oppressed male population. Before leaving the planet, they leave behind a "Gay Ambassador" to educate the Earthlings about their new way of life.

== Cast ==
- Coco P. Dalbert as ArmInAss
- Sammy Saloman as Capt. B. Dick
- Gerald F. Hail as D. Ildo
- Gbatokai Dakinah as Sgt. Shaved Balls
- Konrad Fields as Mr. Schwul
- Johnny Conny Tony Thomas as The Gay Ambassador

== Reception ==
The film was first screened at the NatFilm Festival in Copenhagen on 23 February 1993, and was screened at the Stockholm Queer Film Festival in 2006.

In the 2019 book It Came from Something Awful, Dale Beran described the film as a "queer-interest Dutch [sic] B movie in the hyper-transgressive tradition of John Waters" that appealed to an audience of "nerdy white boys" who liked the concept of blaxploitation. The film was used in a recruiting campaign by the internet troll group Gay Nigger Association of America in the 2000s, who took their name from the film.

In 2024 an internet meme relating to the movie gained popularity, where people would convince others to search the phrase "what space movie came out in 1992" or "space movie 1992". This would return results of the movie's IMDb and Wikipedia pages. The shock value of the title is the main purpose of the meme, not the contents of the movie.

== Production ==
The film begins in black-and-white and later turns to color, in a way similar to The Wizard of Oz. According to director Morten Lindberg, this was a "dramatic special effect" to illustrate "the world being freed from vicious women".
