= Master Fatman =

Danish media personality (1965–2019)

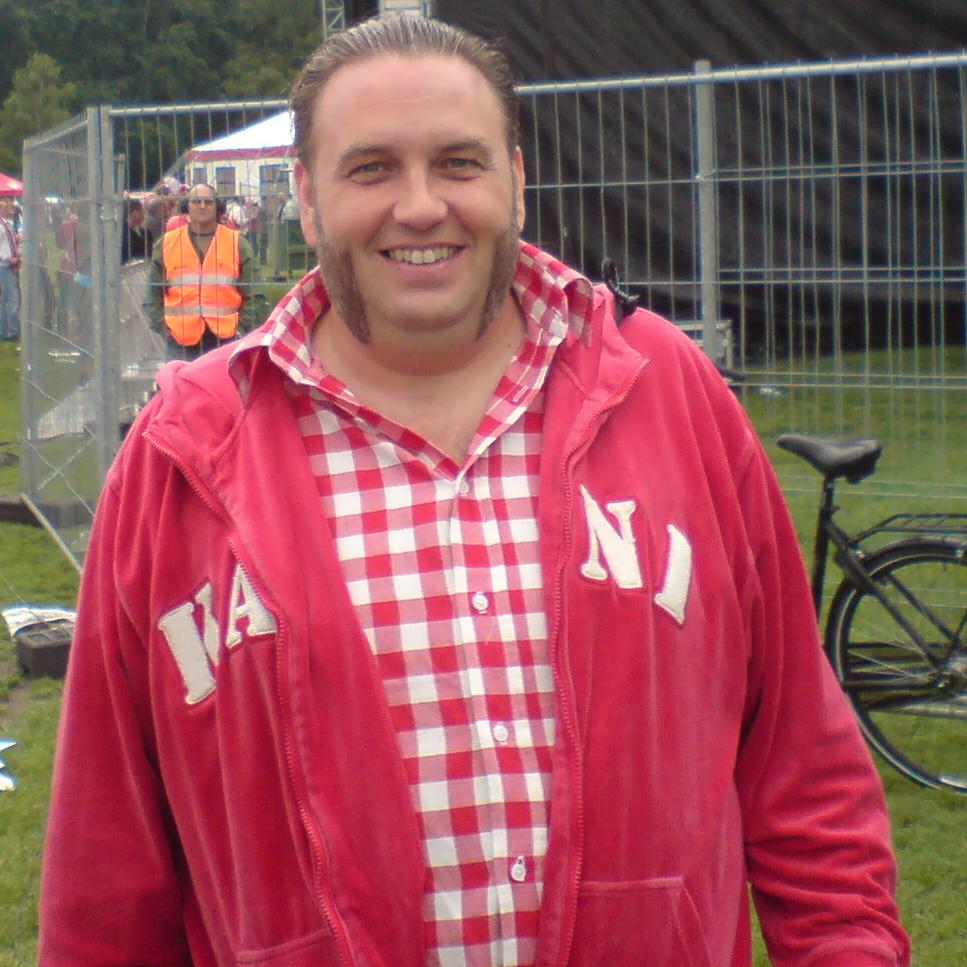
- Lindberg in 2007
- Born: 23 September 1965; Munkebo, Denmark
- Died: 26 March 2019 (aged 53)
- Other names: Master Fatman
- Occupations: Comedian; disc jockey; film director
- Spouse: Herminia Mabunda (m. 2010)
- Children: 5

Morten Mabunda Lindberg (né Lindberg; 23 September 1965 – 26 March 2019), also known as "Master Fatman", was a Danish film director, comedian, taxi driver, disc jockey, and actor.

In 2010, Lindberg married Herminia Mabunda from Mozambique and adopted her surname. He died at age 53 on March 26, 2019, and was survived by five children.

== Creative engagements ==
Lindberg was involved with underground performance art and entertainment for many years. His stage name "Master Fatman" was first chosen during a performance of his in March 1987, attempting to channel and incarnate Liberace's soul into his body. Lindberg used other stage names and alter egos, but Master Fatman eventually emerged as the most popular one.

Lindberg had a very broad range of interests and engaged with magazine writing, publishing and editing, theatre, film, tv, radio and music, usually with a good deal of humour and subtle irony, but also out of genuine artistic interest and curiosity, and an urge for creative expression. In the early 1990s, he took up an interest in acting and film making, and among his first engagements was the lowbudget short film Gayniggers from Outer Space, which later obtained a cult status. This was the first and only time Lindberg tried his hands with film directing, but he continued his film interest with acting roles and writing. In 1993, after travelling in India, Lindberg started the political party "Det Kosmiske Parti" (The Cosmic Party) and participated in the Copenhagen municipal elections as the love preaching self-styled guru "Tykmesteren" (The Fatmaster) the following year, another stage name of his. Although close to being elected, he didn't make it, but kept evolving the cosmic guru role and was associated with it ever after. Through the later half of the 1990s and early 2000s, he edited and wrote for the underground magazine "Magasin Schäfer" along with Danish writers Martin Kongstad and Henrik List.

Master Fatman participated in the Danish Eurovision Song Contest of 1995 with his song "Jordisk Kærlighed" (Earthly Love), but didn't win. In 2006, also as Master Fatman, he competed in the third season of the dance contest Vild med dans on TV2, wearing several eye-catching costumes, including an Elvis outfit.

Lindberg travelled widely to experience the cultures of the world and he developed particularly strong ties to India, Brazil, Mozambique (and Africa in general), and France. In Brazil, where he lived for extended periods, his social indignation and concern was aroused after experiencing the Brazilian favelas and seeing how rough life was there. As a response, Lindberg eventually set up and sponsored orphanages and humanitarian child care projects in Brazil, among other engagements. With his African wife, Lindberg owned a second home in Mozambique.

=== Music ===
As a musician, Lindberg participated in numerous projects and bands, both as an instrumentalist and a singer. Projects and bands that he has been in include: Master Fatman and his Freedom Fighters, Master Fatman Guru Orchestra, Lindberg Hemmer Foundation, Nature TM and Per Kristensen Band. Most of the bands that Lindberg was involved with were out of the mainstream and only modestly popular.

Lindberg had a very broad range of musical interests, and was an avid jazz lover, in particular the Brazilian Bossa-style jazz, and he ran his own jazz program for several years on the Danish Radio (DR). He was also a frequent host at various Danish jazz events and shows.

=== Food ===
Food, especially vegetarian food, had Lindberg's interest throughout most of his life. He was himself a vegetarian since his early twenties, and he hosted several TV programs about food and cooking for the Danish National TV DR. In his radio show Croque Monsieur at Radio24syv he explored and mediated his love for the French cuisine, in particular his love for cheese and cakes, and followed it up with a cookbook in 2017.

Lindberg's image as an obese man was entirely deliberate and started out as a counterreaction to all the weight loss diets and popular ideals of being slim in the 1980s. He increased his cake consumption, drank cream and ate raw bacon as part of stage acts. Soon, a significant weight gain was achieved and it became part of his public image. Lindberg sought happiness and cosmic love, not material virtues, and to him, being slim simply didn't look good for men.

== Filmography ==
- Gayniggers from Outer Space (1992)
- Spektrum (1994)
- Clemens Show (2000)

== Discography ==
Some of Lindberg's music has only been released on cassettes or in very limited numbers (records and cds) in underground circles. The list of substantial albums and widely circulated releases includes:

- Master Fatman and his Freedom Fighters (1991): "Hail Hail"
- Per Kristensen Band (1995): "Så Er Festen Forbi"
- Lindberg Hemmer Foundation (1996): "Scandinavian supermarket-music at its very best"
- Lindberg Hemmer Foundation (2001): "Brazilian Architecture"

As Master Fatman, Lindberg also released a number of singles, covering disco hits from the 1970s.

== Literature ==
- Torben Eschen (1992): "Ja, jeg tror jeg er en reinkarnation af Bobby Ewing fra Dallas : Master Fatmans livshistorie", Borgen (in Danish)
- David Pepe Birch (2011): "Master Fatman", Lindhardt og Ringhof (in Danish)
- Marie Holm & Morten Lindberg (2017): "Croque Monsieur", People´sPress (in Danish)
  French cooking from Lindberg's radio program Croque Monsieur.
