= .cx =

Top-level Internet domain for Christmas Island

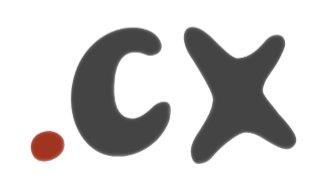
- Introduced: 24 April 1997; 29 years ago
- TLD type: Country code top-level domain
- Status: Active
- Registry: Christmas Island Domain Administration Limited (cxDA)
- Sponsor: Christmas Island Domain Administration Limited (cxDA)
- Intended use: Entities connected with Christmas Island
- Registered domains: ~14,000 (2022-12-14)
- Registration restrictions: None
- Structure: Registrations can be made directly at second level; some third-level names exist for Christmas Island sites such as governmental sites in .gov.cx
- Documents: Registration agreement Acceptable Use Policy
- Dispute policies: CoCCA Complaint Resolution Service
- DNSSEC: yes
- Registry website: cxda.org.cx

.cx is the country code top-level domain for Christmas Island administered by Christmas Island Domain Administration (cxDA).

== Management ==
The Christmas Island Internet Administration is a community-owned non-profit company which also provides Internet service to the island's residents.

.cx is a patron of the Council of Country Code Administrators (CoCCA), a group of country-code domains making use of common registry services. .cx partakes in CoCCA's Complaint Resolution Service (CRS).

== History ==
The .cx top-level domain was delegated on 23 April 1997 to Karinna Love of Planet Three Ltd., a company based in London, United Kingdom.

In 1999, the local Internet community on Christmas Island expressed interest in bringing the domain under local control. An organisation named "Dot CX Limited" was identified as the appropriate recipient, and in 2000 submitted documentation confirming the existing delegee's agreement to transfer control. The Australian government required Dot CX Limited to enter into an agreement with ICANN within a set period; however, despite numerous proposals over several years, no agreement could be reached. During this impasse, IANA continued processing name server changes originating from Dot CX with approval from Australia's Department of Communications, Information Technology and the Arts (DCITA), keeping the .cx domain operational.

In September 2005, a new redelegation request was submitted under the organisation's revised name, Christmas Island Internet Administration Limited (CIIA), endorsed by the Christmas Island Shire Council. In November 2005, the Australian government provided IANA with a formal statement of support for the redelegation. On 10 January 2006, the ICANN Board of Directors authorised the redelegation from Planet Three Ltd. to CIIA. IANA concluded that CIIA met all established criteria, noting that its personnel were already the de facto operators of the .cx zone at the time of the decision.

As of March, 2026, IANA's Delegation Record for .CX notes the legal entity Christmas Island Domain Administration Limited (cxDA) as both the ccTLD manager and administrative contact. cxDA is a not-for-profit, industry self-regulatory entity established in 2000 to administer the .cx ccTLD on behalf of the Christmas Island community. The entity is registered at the Christmas Island Technology Centre, alongside local radio station 6RCI. The IANA record lists an employee of Cocos Islands-based Indian Ocean Territories Telecom Pty Ltd as technical contact for the TLD.

== Controversy ==
The domain achieved a certain degree of notoriety when it was used for the shock site goatse.cx, to the point that the Christmas Island Internet Administration was forced to take down the website following complaints by Christmas Islanders.
