= It Came from Something Awful =

2019 book by Dale Beran

It Came from Something Awful: How a Toxic Troll Army Accidentally Memed Donald Trump into Office
- Author: Dale Beran
- Language: English
- Genre: Non-fiction
- Publisher: All Points Books
- Publication date: 2019

It Came from Something Awful: How a Toxic Troll Army Accidentally Memed Donald Trump into Office is a 2019 book by Dale Beran, focusing on the intersection of Internet culture, alt-right, and Donald Trump's first presidency.
