= Arthur Siskind =

American lawyer and businessperson (born 1938)

- Born: October 11, 1938 (age 87)
- Education: Cornell University
- Occupations: Lawyer, businessperson

Arthur Siskind (born 11 October 1938) is an American lawyer and businessperson. He has been an executive director of the News Corporation since 1991. He served as their group general counsel from March 1991 until December 2004. He was succeeded by Lawrence Jacobs. Siskind remains on News Corporation's board of directors and continues to serve the company as senior advisor to the chairman.

As executive director of New Corp., his salary was $1.7 million with a $5 million annual bonus in 2005.

He graduated from Cornell University. Siskind became an adjunct professor of law at Georgetown University Law Center in 2005 and has been a member of the bar of the State of New York since 1962.

Business positions
Preceded by none	General Counsel of News Corporation; 1991-2004	Succeeded by Lawrence Jacobs
