= Asian Securities and Investments Federation =

Asian Securities and Investments Federation (ASIF) is an association of finance and investment professionals throughout Asia and Oceania with 7 member societies. The association seeks to serve the finance and investment community by fostering high professional standards, including examinations and accreditation, and facilitating communication among member societies. ASIF also promotes education through such activities as annual conferences, publications and educational programs.

== History ==
Formed in 1979 under the name Asian Securities Analysts Council (ASAC), it was subsequently renamed to Asian Securities Analysts Federation (ASAF) in 1995 and to its present title in December 2008.

== ASIF Member societies ==
- Financial Services Institute of Australasia (FINSIA)
- The Securities Analysts Association of China (SAAC)
- Securities Analysts Association, Chinese Taipei (SAA, CT)
- Hong Kong Securities and Investment Institute (HKSI)
- The Securities Analysts Association of Japan (SAAJ)
- The Korea Certified Investment Analysts Association (KCIAA)
- Securities Analysts Association, in Thailand (SAA, Thailand)

== Executive committee ==
Chairman

- Yasuhiro Maehara, President & CEO, The Security Analysts Association of Japan (SAAJ), (Deputy Chairman of ACIIA)

Deputy Chairman

- Lin Yixiang, President, The Securities Analysts Association of China (SAAC) (Chairman of ACIIA)

Directors

- Craig Lindsay, President, Hong Kong Securities Institute (HKSI)
- Russell Thomas, CEO & MD, Financial Services Institute of Australasia (Finsia)

Standing Committees

- Education Committee, Chair, Naoko Mori (SAAJ)
- Advocacy Committee, Chair, Russell Thomas (Finsia)
- Communications Committee, Chair, Kazumichi Karita (SAAJ)
