= Russian State Commission for Radio Frequencies =

The State Commission for Radio Frequencies (Russian: Государственная комиссия по радиочастотам (ГКРЧ)) is an inter-agency coordinating body under the Ministry of Communications and Mass Media of the Russian Federation, which has full authority in the regulation of radio spectrum. The commission is organized in accordance with Article 22 of the Federal Communications Law number 126-FZ dated July 7, 2003. The commission carries out on a collective basis to regulate the use of radio spectrum in the Russian Federation.
