= European Federation of Financial Analysts Societies =

Federation of analysts associations in Europe

- Abbreviation: EFFAS
- Established: 1962; 64 years ago
- Type: Nonprofit organization
- Location: Frankfurt, Germany
- Region served: Europe
- Members: 14 national and local societies (2023)
- Website: effas.com

The European Federation of Financial Analysts Societies (EFFAS) is the federation of financial analyst associations in Europe. EFFAS is the umbrella organization of 14 national, local societies of investment professionals in Europe.

Its mission is to set the requirement standards for investment professionals, to act as a think tank and center for discussion and be a European provider of training & qualifications.

EFFAS represents more than 18,000 financial analysts, asset managers, pension fund managers, corporate finance specialists, risk managers, treasurers and other professional profiles in the investment professions. EFFAS promotes the development and dissemination of a European Code of Ethics and Professional Conduct, while recognizing and respects regional and local market characteristics.

== History ==
EFFAS was founded in 1962. Its headquarters are located in Hamburger Allee 45, 60486, Frankfurt, Germany. EFFAS is a not-for-profit organization.

== EFFAS Certifications ==
EFFAS provides certifications and qualifications for finance professionals, including:

1. The Certified European Financial Analyst Diploma (CEFA) was set up in 1991. It is accredited in 15 European countries as well as in Argentina and Brazil. Over 16,300 professionals in Europe are CEFA holders.

2. The Certified Environmental Social and Governance Analysts (CESGA) designation.

3. The EFFAS ESG Essentials certification provides qualifies participants to give basic guidance to ESG investors.

4. The EFFAS Digital Assets & MiCA (DiAM) certification was launched in 2023. The curriculum covers the core elements of the technology, its business use cases and relevant regulatory frameworks. The program trains individuals to analyze crypto-asset projects and financial sector developments.

== EFFAS Commissions ==
1. EFFAS Commission on ESG (CESG) communicates the needs of investment professionals in capital markets to corporations and provides practical advice in the form of Key Performance Indicators and interactive data formats.

2. EFFAS Capital Markets Commission (CMC).

3. EFFAS Commission on Financial Reporting (CFR) provides analysts’ views on the definition of International Financial Reporting Standards (IFRS) to international accounting standards setters. Its members work closely with the International Accounting Standard Board (IASB) through the Global Analysts’ group and the European Financial Reporting Advisory Group (EFRAG) through the Users’ Panel. EFRAG provides advice to the European Commission on the implementation of IFRS.

4. EFFAS Commission on Training & Qualification (TQC) provides advice to the European Management Committee of EFFAS on training and qualification, and evaluates the accreditations of professional designations at EFFAS and its national member societies through its Review Panel.

== Member societies ==
Country	Member society
Austria - ÖVFA	Österreichische Vereinigung für Finanzanalyse und Asset Management (The Austrian Association for Financial Analysis and Investment Advisory Services)
Belgium - ABAF	ABAF - Association Belge des Analystes Financiers (Belgian Association of Financial Analysts)
Malta - IFS Malta	Institute of Financial Services (IFS) Malta
Finland - FSFA	The Finnish Society of Financial Analysts
France - SFAF	French Society of Financial Analysts
Germany - DVFA	Deutsche Vereinigung für Finanzanalyse und Asset Management (Society of Investment Professionals in Germany)
Hungary - HCMPS	Hungarian Capital Market Professionals Society/Society of Hungarian Investment Analysts
Italy - AIAF	Italian Financial Analysts Society (AIAF Associazione Italiana degli Analisti e Consulenti Finanziari)
Norway - FFN	The Finance Society Norway
Portugal - APAF	APAF - Associação Portuguesa de Analistas Financeiros (Portuguese Association of Financial Analysts)
Romania - AAFBR	Romanian Association of Financial-Banking Analysts
Spain - Instituto Español de Analistas	Instituto Español de Analistas (Spanish Institute of Analysts)
Sweden - SFF	The Swedish Society of Financial Analysts
Switzerland - SFAA	The Swiss Society of Financial Analysts
