= Securities Analysts Association of China =

Securities Analysts Association of China (SAAC; Chinese: 对中国证券分析师协会) is a specialized organisation working under the leadership of the Securities Association of China, a nationwide self-regulatory organisation for the Chinese securities market investment consulting industry.

SAAC is under the Securities Association of China. SAAC was established on 5 July 2000. On 20 June 2007, SAAC held its third member's meeting and elected its new board. There are currently 30 experts in the Board including one president, seven vice presidents, 17 committee members and five consultants. Lin Yixiang is the current chairman of SAAC. SAAC has redefined its objectives and revised it's Working Rules.

The mission of the SAAC is to:

- Consider, collect and report opinions and suggestions regarding/from the industry.
- Study and explain policies and programs relating to the industry.
- Prepare and review self-regulatory codes, rules, performance standards and guidelines for the securities investment consulting industry.
- Organise and support innovative activities of the industry, summarize and advocate the experiences.
- Make recommendations to the SAC on punishment measures to member companies or professionals violated laws and regulations or self-regulatory codes and rules by the SAC.
- Mediate between member societies on business disputes.
- Assist in securities analysts training.
- Promote international exchange and cooperation.
- Fulfill other missions as may be entrusted by the SAC.
