= Teledesic =

Satellite company

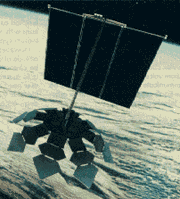
A typical Teledesic satellite design

Teledesic was a company founded in the 1990s to build a commercial broadband satellite internet constellation. Using low-Earth-orbiting satellites small antennas could be used to provide uplinks of as much as 100 Mbit/s and downlinks of up to 720 Mbit/s. The original 1994 proposal was extremely ambitious, costing over 9 billion USD and originally planning 840 active satellites with in-orbit spares at an altitude of 700 km (430 mi). In 1997, the plan was scaled back to 288 active satellites at 1400 km (900 miles). Teledesic Corporation changed its name to Teledesic, LLC by pro forma assignment of its license, granted on 26 January 1998.

The commercial failure of the similar Iridium and Globalstar ventures (composed of 66 and 48 operational satellites respectively) and other systems, along with bankruptcy protection filings, were primary factors in halting the project, and Teledesic officially suspended its satellite construction work on 1 October 2002.

== Description ==
Announced in March 1994 as a satellite constellation with 840 satellites and initial $5 million investments from Bill Gates and Craig McCaw, the Teledesic system would have provided "fiber-optic like" links to customers around the world. The system was to act as a network operator and support communications ranging from high-quality voice channels to broadband channels supporting video-conferencing, interactive multimedia, and real-time two-way data flow. Teledesic was notable for gaining early funding from Gates; McCaw, founder of McCaw Cellular Communications; and Saudi prince Alwaleed bin Talal. The system would have used Ka band to send and receive signals from users. Each satellite would have acted as a node in a large-scale packet-switching network. The service was planned to begin in 2002 with a total cost of the project estimated at US$9 billion.

The satellites were three-axis stabilized with a faceted antenna on the bottom and a large articulated solar panel on top, weighing around 800 kg (1,800 lb) at launch (1,100 kg (2,400 lb) with a "dispenser/tug", intended to transport the satellite to its final orbit). The spacecraft was designed to be compatible with over 20 different launch vehicles to permit launch option flexibility. The satellites were to be launched into a 700 km (430 mi) circular, near-polar (98.2°) Sun-synchronous orbit. The initial rollout was to include 12 orbit planes with 24 spacecraft in each plane. The antenna footprint for each satellite was to be about 700 km^{2} (270 sq mi). Teledesic planned 288 satellites in 12 LEO orbits, each at an altitude of 1,315 km (817 mi).

Many were immediately skeptical of the proposal. Describing Teledesic as absurd, Howard Anderson of the Yankee Group said that it was "a third-world solution at a first-world price. The developed world doesn't need it, and the underdeveloped world can't afford it". Larry Gessini of the International Communications Association was amazed by the proposal to launch 840 satellites. Andrew Seybold, consultant, doubted that Teledesic could get approval for spectrum around the world from the World Administrative Radio Conference.

== BATSAT (Teledesic 1) ==
A demonstration satellite for the Teledesic constellation, originally labeled Broadband Advanced Technologies Satellite (BATSAT), and later renamed Teledesic 1 or just T1 (COSPAR ID 1998-012B), was launched from Vandenberg Air Force Base on a Pegasus-XL launch vehicle on 26 February 1998 at 07:07:00 UTC. The satellite differed in size and design from the anticipated satellite for the final constellation, but was designed to support two-way communications at speeds up to E1 rates in the 28.6-to-29.1-GHz band. The 120 kg (265 lb) satellite was placed in a 535 km (330 mile) × 580 km (360 mile) orbit at 97.7° inclination and a period of 95.8 minutes.

It was the first Ka-band satellite in orbit owned by a commercial enterprise. The satellite decayed from orbit on 9 October 2000.
