= Satellite constellation =

Group of artificial satellites working together as a system

The GPS constellation calls for 24 satellites to be distributed equally among six orbital planes. Notice how the number of satellites in view from a given point on the Earth's surface, in this example at 40°N, changes with time.

A satellite constellation is a group of artificial satellites working together as a system. Unlike a single satellite, a constellation can provide permanent global or near-global coverage, such that at any time everywhere on Earth at least one satellite is visible. Satellites are typically placed in sets of complementary orbital planes and connect to globally distributed ground stations. They may also use inter-satellite communication.

== Other satellite groups ==
Satellite constellations should not be confused with:

- satellite clusters, which are groups of satellites moving very close together in almost identical orbits (see satellite formation flying);
- satellite series or satellite programs (such as Landsat), which are generations of satellites launched in succession;
- satellite fleets, which are groups of satellites from the same manufacturer or operator that function independently from each other (not as a system).

== Overview ==
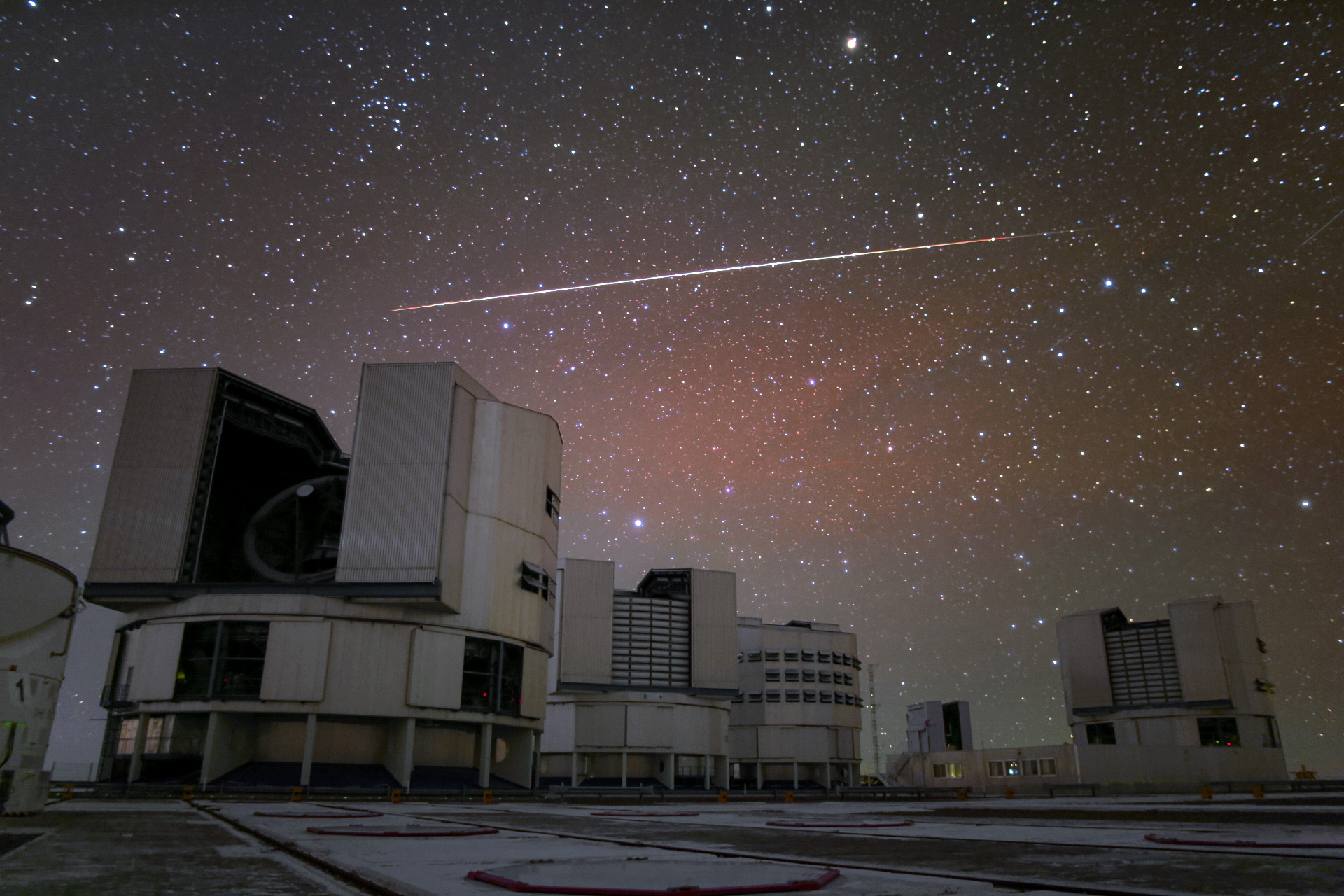
A bright artificial satellite flare is visible above the Very Large Telescope. Satellite constellations could have an impact on ground-based astronomy.

Satellites in medium Earth orbit (MEO) and low Earth orbit (LEO) are often deployed in satellite constellations, because the coverage area provided by a single satellite only covers a small area that moves as the satellite travels at the high angular velocity needed to maintain its orbit. Many MEO or LEO satellites are needed to maintain continuous coverage over an area. This contrasts with geostationary satellites, where a single satellite, at a much higher altitude and moving at the same angular velocity as the rotation of the Earth's surface, provides permanent coverage over a large area.

For some applications, in particular digital connectivity, the lower altitude of MEO and LEO satellite constellations provide advantages over a geostationary satellite, with lower path losses (reducing power requirements and costs) and latency. The propagation delay for a round-trip internet protocol transmission via a geostationary satellite can be over 600 ms, but as low as 125 ms for a MEO satellite or 30 ms for a LEO system.

Examples of satellite constellations include the Global Positioning System (GPS), Galileo and GLONASS constellations for navigation and geodesy in MEO, the Iridium and Globalstar satellite telephony services and Orbcomm messaging service in LEO, the Disaster Monitoring Constellation and RapidEye for remote sensing in Sun-synchronous LEO, Russian Molniya and Tundra communications constellations in highly elliptic orbit, and satellite broadband constellations, under construction from Starlink and OneWeb in LEO, and operational from O3b in MEO.

== Design ==
=== Optimization-based Design ===
Designing a satellite constellation (i.e., determining the orbital distribution of its constituents) is a complex problem that typically uses satellite-to-target coverage as the primary figure of merit. Naturally, the resulting constellation depends on the mission requirements and objectives and can be characterized by its geometry. That is, either symmetric or asymmetric constellations.

Symmetric constellations are traditionally proposed for applications that require global coverage (e.g., telecommunications). Notable symmetric constellations proposed in the literature include Walker Delta and Star, and Rosette.

Asymmetric constellations are typically adopted when regional coverage (i.e., the distribution of targets is concentrated around specific locations rather than being globally uniform) is required. Asymmetric constellations are proposed to address disaster monitoring, orbital debris remediation, and cislunar space domain awareness.

Large satellite constellations are evaluated against equivalent power flux density (EPFD) limits to ensure their combined transmissions remain compatible with geostationary satellite services.

The need for optimization in constellation design arises from the large number of degrees of freedom in the design space. For example, payload characteristics, required temporal coverage resolution (e.g., continuous or discontinuous), target distribution, and candidate orbits. Conventional optimization methodologies used for constellation design include:

- Full enumeration
- Mixed integer linear programming
- Metaheuristics

=== Walker Constellation ===
There are a large number of constellations that may satisfy a particular mission. Usually constellations are designed so that the satellites have similar orbits, eccentricity and inclination so that any perturbations affect each satellite in approximately the same way. In this way, the geometry can be preserved without excessive station-keeping thereby reducing the fuel usage and hence increasing the life of the satellites. Another consideration is that the phasing of each satellite in an orbital plane maintains sufficient separation to avoid collisions or interference at orbit plane intersections.

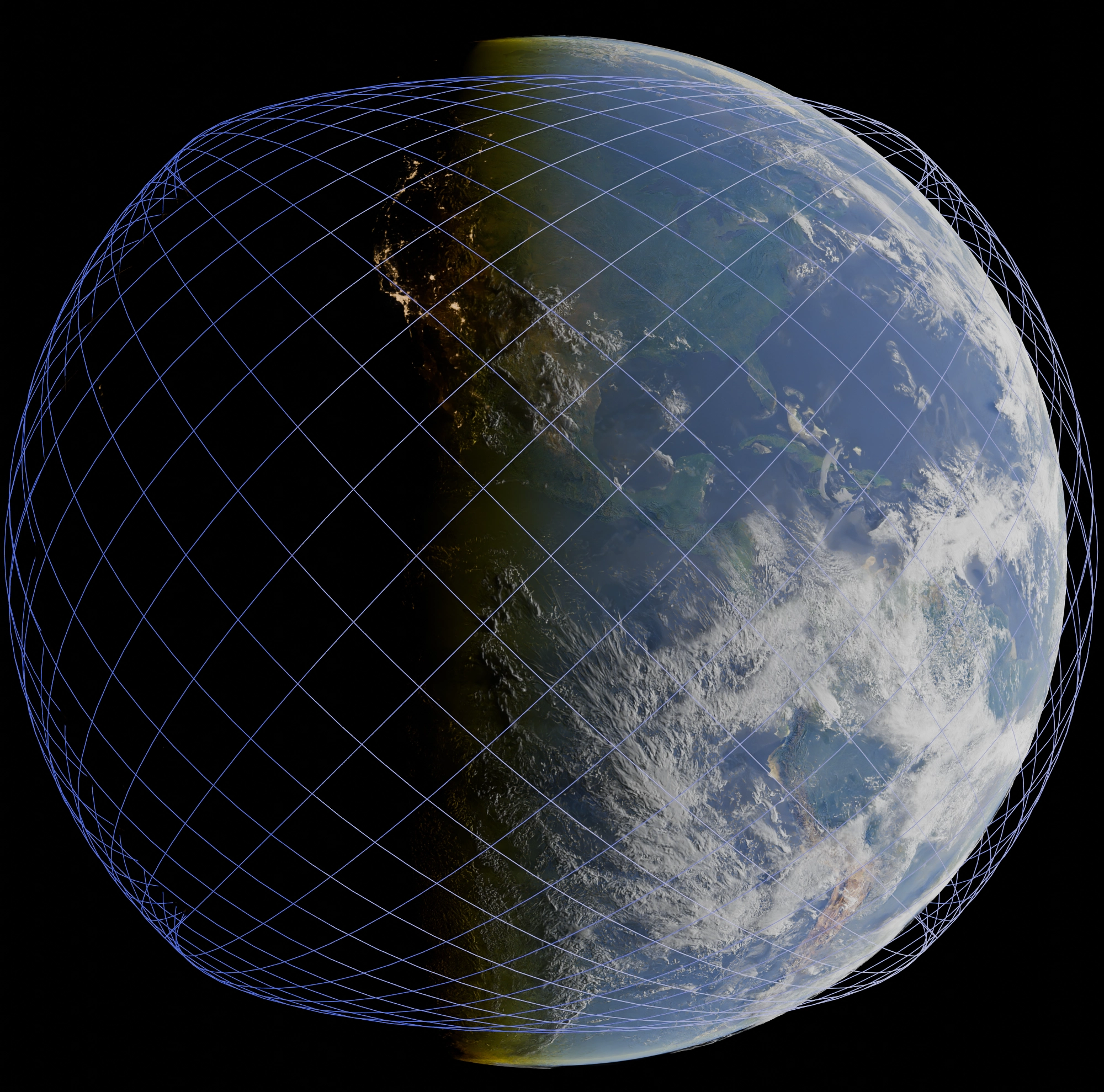
Walker-Delta Constellation

A class of circular orbit geometries that has become popular is the Walker Delta Pattern constellation. This has an associated notation to describe it which was proposed by John Walker. His notation is:

i: t/p/f

where:

- i is the inclination;
- t is the total number of satellites;
- p is the number of equally spaced planes; and
- f is the relative spacing between satellites in adjacent planes. The change in true anomaly (in degrees) for equivalent satellites in neighbouring planes is equal to f × 360 / t.

For example, the Galileo navigation system is a Walker Delta 56°: 24/3/1 constellation. This means there are 24 satellites in 3 planes inclined at 56 degrees, spanning the 360 degrees around the equator. The "1" defines the phasing between the planes, and how they are spaced. The Walker Delta is also known as the Ballard rosette, after A. H. Ballard's similar earlier work. Ballard's notation is (t,p,m) where m is a multiple of the fractional offset between planes.

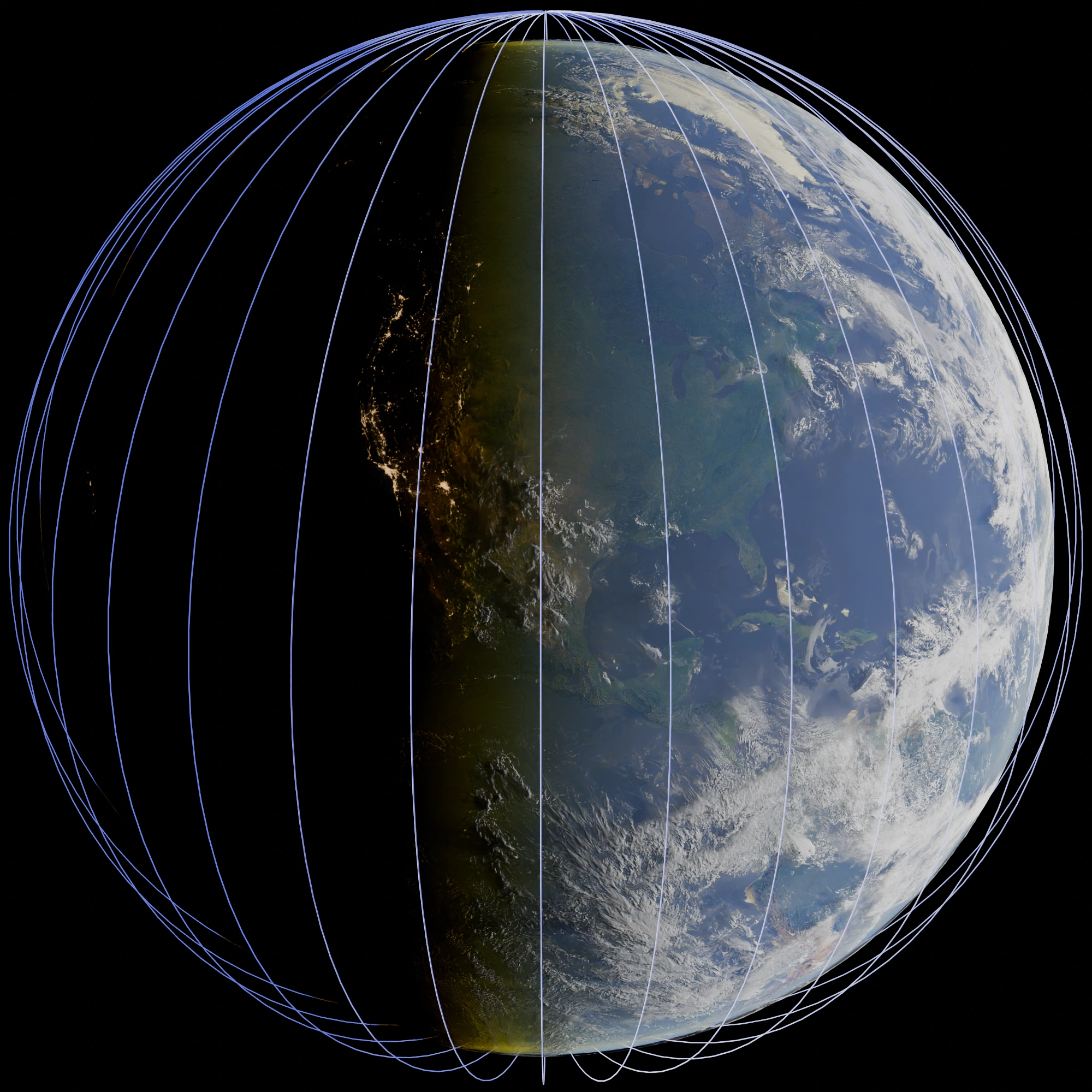
Walker-Star Constellation

Another popular constellation type is the near-polar Walker Star, which is used by Iridium. Here, the satellites are in near-polar circular orbits across approximately 180 degrees, travelling north on one side of the Earth, and south on the other. The active satellites in the full Iridium constellation form a Walker Star of 86.4°: 66/6/2, i.e. the phasing repeats every two planes. Walker uses similar notation for stars and deltas, which can be confusing.

These sets of circular orbits at constant altitude are sometimes referred to as orbital shells.

== Orbital shell ==
In spaceflight, an orbital shell is a set of artificial satellites in circular orbits at a certain fixed altitude. In the design of satellite constellations, an orbital shell usually refers to a collection of circular orbits with the same altitude and, oftentimes, orbital inclination, distributed evenly in celestial longitude (and mean anomaly). For a sufficiently high inclination and altitude the orbital shell covers the entire orbited body. In other cases the coverage extends up to a certain maximum latitude.

Several existing satellite constellations typically use a single orbital shell. New large megaconstellations have been proposed that consist of multiple orbital shells.

== List of satellite constellations ==
=== Navigational satellite constellations ===
Satellite constellations used for navigation
Name	Operator	Satellites and orbits (latest design, excluding spares)	Coverage	Services	Status	Years in service
Global Positioning System (GPS)	USSF (US)	24 in 6 planes at 20,180 km (55° MEO) No expansion planned as of June 2026.	Global	Navigation	Operational	1993–present
GLONASS	Roscosmos (Russia)	24 in 3 planes at 19,130 km (64°8' MEO) No expansion planned as of June 2026.	Global	Navigation	Operational	1995–present
Galileo	EUSPA, ESA (EU)	26 in 3 planes at 23,222 km (56° MEO) No expansion planned as of June 2026.	Global	Navigation	Operational	2019–present
BeiDou	CNSA (CN)	5 geostationary at 35,786 km (GEO); 3 in 3 planes at 35,786 km (55° GSO); 27 in 3 planes at 21,150 km (55° MEO); No expansion planned as of June 2026.	Global	Navigation	Operational	2012–present, Asia; 2018–present, globally
NAVIC	ISRO (India)	3 geostationary at 35,786 km (GEO); 5 in 2 planes at 250–24,000 km (29° GSO); Total number of satellites planned : 12	Regional	Navigation	Operational	2018–present
QZSS	JAXA (JPN)	1 geostationary at 35,786 km (GEO); 3 in 3 planes at 32,600–39,000 (43° GSO); Total of seven satellites with minimum 4 always in operation	Regional	Navigation	Operational	2018–present
Pulsar	Xona Space systems (US)	1 in LEO . A total of 258 are planned	global	PNT navigation	operational	2025-present
Trsutpoint	Trustpoint (US)	0 in LEO as of June 2026. A total up to 300 is planned.	global	PNT navigation	PLANNED	2027
PNT-LEO	ArkEdge Space(JPN)/ JAXA (JPN)	0 in LEO as of June 2026. Unknown total planned.	TBD	PNT	PLANNED	TBD

=== Communications satellite constellations ===
==== Broadcasting ====
- Sirius Satellite Radio until 2013
- XM Satellite Radio until 2011
- Sirius XM Radio -operational
- SES
- Othernet
- Molniya (discontinued)

==== Monitoring ====
- Spire (AIS, ADS-B)
- Iridium (AIS, ADS-B, IoT)
- Myriota (IoT)
- Swarm Technologies (IoT)
- Astrocast (IoT)
- TDRSS
- Gonets (M2M)

==== Internet access ====
Operational communications satellite constellations
Name	Operator	Constellation design	Coverage	Freq.	Services
Broadband Global Area Network (BGAN)	Inmarsat (UK)	4 geostationary satellites No expansion planned as of June 2026.	82°S to 82°N	L band	Internet access
Global Xpress (GX)	Inmarsat (UK)	8 Geostationary satellites A total of 13 satellites are planned for this constellation		K_{a} band	Internet access
Globalstar	Globalstar (US)(soon Amazon)	48 at 1400 km, 52° (8 planes) No expansion planned as of June 2026.	70°S to 70°N		Internet access, satellite telephony
Iridium	Iridium Communications (US)	66 at 780 km, 86.4° (6 planes) No expansion planned as of June 2026.	Global	L band; K_{a} band	Internet access, satellite telephony
O3b	SES (Lux)	20 at 8,062 km, 0° (circular equatorial orbit)	45°S to 45°N	K_{a} band	Internet access
O3b mPOWER	SES (Lux)	10 at 8,062 km, 0° (circular equatorial orbit); 3 more to be launched by end 2026	45°S to 45°N	K_{a} (26.5–40 GHz)	Internet access
Orbcomm	ORBCOMM (US)	17 at 750 km, 52° (OG2)	65°S to 65°N		IoT and M2M, AIS
Defense Satellite Communications System (DSCS)	4th Space Operations Squadron				Military communications
Wideband Global SATCOM (WGS)	4th Space Operations Squadron (US)	10 geostationary satellites With a total of 12 satellites planned			Military communications
ViaSat	Viasat, Inc. (US)	4 geostationary satellites. No expansion planned as of June 2026.	Varying		Internet access
Eutelsat	Eutelsat (FR)	31 geostationary satellites No expansion planned as of June 2026.			Commercial
Thuraya	Space42(UAE)	3 geostationary satellites No expansion planned as of June 2026.	EMEA and Asia	L band	Internet access, satellite telephony
Starlink	SpaceX (US)	LEO in several orbital shells: ~10 397 satellites at 550 km (Jun 2026); 42 000 total satellites at ~350–550 km (planned)	44°S to 52°N (Feb 2021); Global	K_{u} (12–18 GHz); K_{a} (26.5–40 GHz)	Internet access
OneWeb constellation	Eutelsat (completed merger in Sep 2023)(FR)	882–1980 (planned) Number of operational satellites: 654 as of 16 June 2026	Global	K_{u} (12–18 GHz); K_{a} (26.5–40 GHz)	Internet access
Amazon LEO	Amazon (US)	330+ in orbit as of June 2026 at 590-630km/ 370–390 miles Total number of satellites planned : 3 236	56°S to 56°N aiming for global	Ka (27.5-30 GHz)[50]	Internet access
Astra	SES (Lux)	10 operational and 3 backups in LEO Total planned: 13620	global	V-Band	Internet access
Guowang	China Satellite Network Group(CN)	177 in LEO Total number planned: 13 000.	global	Q/V band 37.5-42.5 GHz 47.2-51.4 GHz	Internet access
Yinhe	Galaxy Space(CN)	8 in LEO as of June 2026 Total number planned: 1 000	global	K_{a} Q/V band	5G
TianTong	China Telecom (CN)	3 in GEO. No expansion planned as of June 2026.	Middle East, Asia, Africa	S-Band	D2D
Viasat-3	Viasat Inc.(US)	3 in GEO(22 237 miles) No expansion planned as of June 2026.	90% global. No coverage on Poles and Iceland, Greenland.	K_{a} Band	Internet access
Connecta	Plan S(Turkey)	16 in LEO Total planned constellation of 200+	global		IoT
Ultralite	Myriota(AUS)	40+ in LEO	global	VHF and UHF	IoT
AstroCast	AstroCast (Switzerland)	18 nanosats in LEO (Plan for 100sats by 2024 but severe delays/future uncertain because of financial struggles)	global	L-band	Iot
Al Yah	Space42(UAE)	2 in GEO Total of 4 planned	EU, Asia, Africa, Middle East	C,L, K_{a}, K_{u} band	Internet access
Unicorn	Alba Orbital(UK)	15 in LEO Total of ~20 planned	global	UHF amateur bands (437MHz; 2.4 GHz) uplift and downlift	Internet access
Fossa Systems	Fossa Systems (Spain) w/ EU	25 in LEO Total of ~80 planned	global	UHF ISM	IoT
Hello Space	Hello Space(Turkey)	1 in LEO Total of 100 planned	global		IoT
Arkedge Space	ArkEdge Space (JPN)	3 in LEO	global		VDES
TY-MiniSAR	Spacety CN)	min 2 sats in LEO. Total of 56 planned	global	C-band and X-Band	Internet access
anuvu	anuvu(US)	2 in GEO. Total planned : 8	global		Internet access
Qianfan	SSST(CN)	201 in LEO. Total of 15 000 planned.	global	K_{u} , Q and V bands	Internet access
TDRS	NASA(US)	7 in GEO. No expansion planned as of June 2026.	global	S, K_{u} , K_{a} band	Internet access
Bluewalker/Bluebird	AST SpaceMobile (US)	9 in LEO Total planned : 168	global		connectivity direct to smartphones
Tianqi 3G	Beijing Guodian Gaoke (CN)	41 in orbit LEO with 29 operational. A total of 3 918 is planned	global		data relay

Other Internet access systems are proposed or currently being developed:

Some systems were proposed but never realized:

Abandoned communication satellite constellation designs
Name	Operator	Constellation design	Freq.	Services	Abandoned date
Celestri	Motorola	63 satellites at 1400 km, 48° (7 planes)	K_{a} band (20/30 GHz)	Global, low-latency broadband Internet services	1998 May
Teledesic	Teledesic	840 satellites at 700 km, 98.2° (21 planes) [1994 design]; 288 satellites at 1400 km, 98.2° (12 planes) [1997 design]	K_{a} band (20/30 GHz)	100 Mbit/s up, 720 Mbit/s down global internet access	2002 October
LeoSat	Thales Alenia	78–108 satellites at 1400 km	K_{a} (26.5–40 GHz)	High-speed broadband internet	2019

Progress

- Boeing Satellite is transferring the application to OneWeb
- LeoSat shut down completely in 2019
- The OneWeb constellation had 6 pilot satellites in February 2019, 74 satellites launched as of 21 March 2020 but filed for bankruptcy on 27 March 2020
- Starlink: first mission (Starlink 0) launched on 24 May 2019; 955 satellites launched, 51 deorbited, 904 in orbit as of 25 November 2020; public beta test in limited latitude range started in November 2020
- O3b mPOWER: first 6 satellites launched December 2022-November 2023 with service start April 2024. 7 more in 2024–2026.
- Telesat LEO: two prototypes: 2018 launch
- CASIC Hongyun: prototype launched in December 2018
- CASC Hongyan prototype launched in December 2018, might be merged with Hongyun
- Project Kuiper: FCC filing in July 2019. Prototypes launched in October 2023.

=== Earth observation satellite constellations ===
Operational Earth observation/remote sensing satellite constellations
Constellation	operator	Constellation design	coverage	service
Jilin-1	Chang Guang Satellite Technology (CN)	63 satellites in SSO LEO. With a total planned of 300.	global	EO, ISR support, maritime monitoring
Spire	SpireGlobal (US)	83 in LEOWith a total scalable up to 200	global	EO, weather monitoring
Foresight	Space42 (UAE)	5 in LEO	nearly global	EO, SAR Radar
Grid	Tsinghua University (CN)	5 in LEO with a total of 20-30 planned	global	Gamma Ray Bursts observation
CO3D	CNES (FR)	4 in LEO with a plan of 20 in total	global	mapping and imaging
Aleph-1	Satellogic (US)	54 (+3 prototypes) in LEO. A total of 200+ is planned	global	EO
DMC	DMCii (Multiple countries)	6 in LEO	global	EO imaging
Starpool(Xingchi)	EllipSpace (CN)	4 in LEO. With a total of 112 planned	global	remote sensing, iCNR
CentiSpace/ WALKER				
Capella X-SAR				
iceye				
Gaojing				
yunyao				
HiVE				
HJ-2				
Swarm				
Umbra				
SkySat				
KGS				
RCM				
QPS-SAR				
StriX				
Hancom	Hancom InSpace (South Korea)	3 (hyperspectral) in LEO Planned constellation of 50	global	remote sensing image data
Hawkey-360				
Atlantic	ESA (EU), AEE (SP), Portugal Space (PT), UKSA (UK)		Atlantic ocean	
Lusíada	LusoSpace (PT)		global	

- RADARSAT Constellation
- Planet Labs
- Pléiades 1A and 1B
- Satellogic
- RapidEye
- Disaster Monitoring Constellation
- A-train
- SPOT 6 and SPOT 7
- Spire
- Synspective
- Proposed satellite constellations of EO mission:
- SatLeo
- Scout NanoMagSat
- Veery
- REC
- StingRay

== See also ==
- Satellite internet constellation
- Light pollution
- Space debris
- Types of geocentric orbit
- Orbital mechanics
