= Starlink =

SpaceX satellite Internet constellation

Starlink Services, LLC

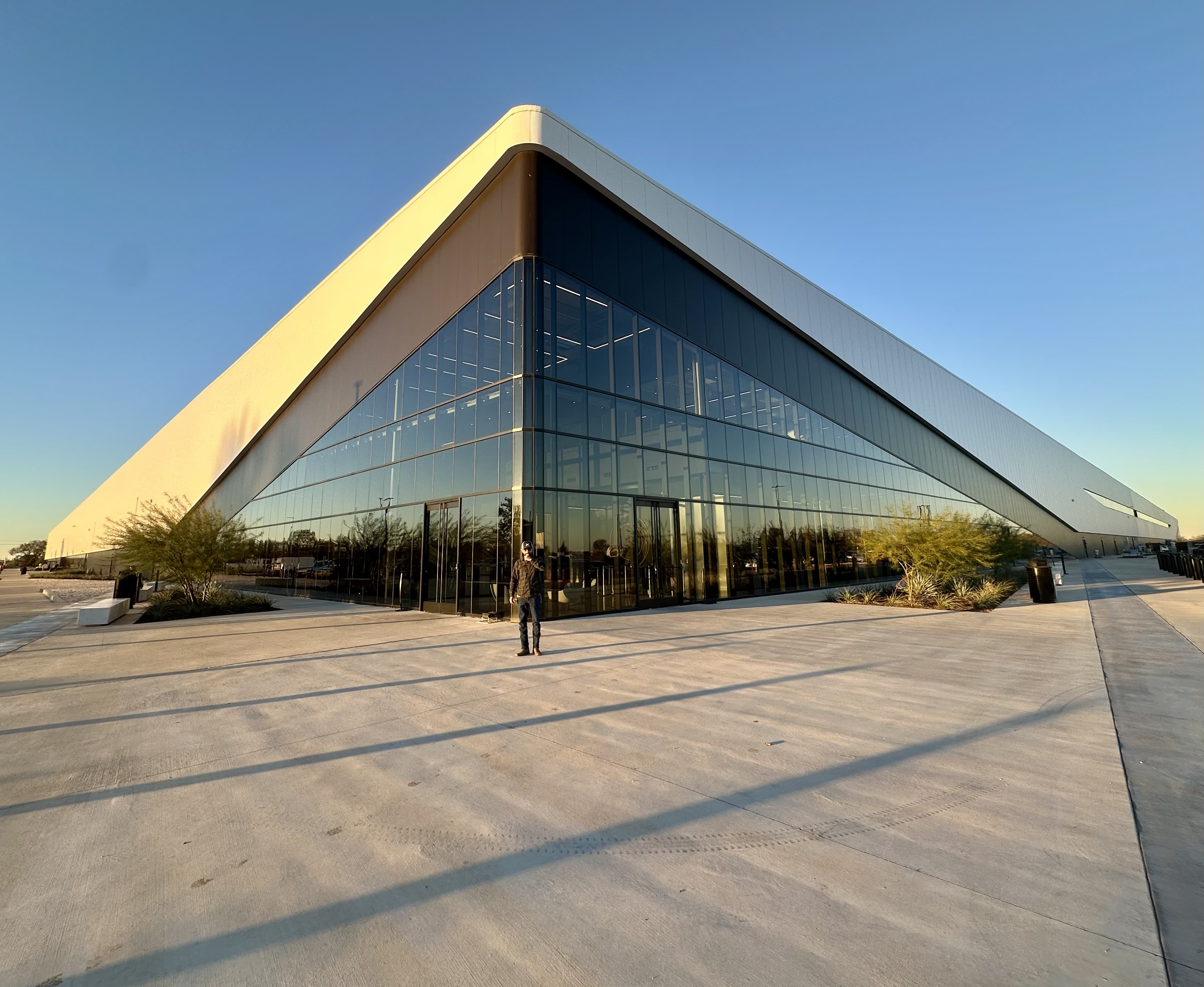
- Starlink user equipment manufacturing facility in Bastrop, Texas
- Trade name: Starlink
- Type: Subsidiary
- Industry: Telecommunications
- Founded: January 2015; 11 years ago
- Headquarters: Redmond, Washington, U.S.
- Revenue: ▲US$11.4 billion (2025)
- Operating income: ▲US$4.4 billion (2025)
- Members: 13.6 million consumer subscribers (September 2026)
- Parent: SpaceX
- Divisions: Starshield
- ASN: 14593
- Website: starlink.com
- Footnotes; Financials as of December 31, 2025. References

Starlink Services, LLC is a telecommunications subsidiary of the American spaceflight company SpaceX, providing broadband Internet service in approximately 160 countries and territories. It also aims to provide global mobile broadband. SpaceX began launching Starlink satellites in 2019. As of October 2026, the network consisted of approximately 11,150 satellites in orbit (roughly 10,800–11,100 operational, depending on the tracking source) in low Earth orbit (LEO) that communicate with user terminals and gateway ground stations connecting the constellation to terrestrial internet infrastructure. Starlink also provides in-flight internet access for numerous airlines. Starlink accounts for approximately 75% of all active maneuverable satellites in Earth orbit and had 13.6 million consumer subscribers as of September 30, 2026.

In May 2018, SpaceX estimated the cost of designing, building, and deploying the constellation to be at least US$10 billion. By the end of 2025, Starlink had become SpaceX's largest business segment, generating $11.4 billion in revenue and $4.4 billion in operating income. In the third quarter of 2026, the Connectivity segment reported $5.25 billion in revenue and $2.37 billion in operating income.

In addition to civilian broadband service, Starlink is also used for government and military communications, including in the Russo-Ukrainian war. Its large satellite constellation has been criticized by astronomers for increasing light pollution and orbital congestion.

== History ==
=== Background ===
Constellations of low Earth orbit (LEO) satellites were first conceptualized in the mid-1980s as part of the United States Strategic Defense Initiative, culminating in Brilliant Pebbles, where weapons were to be staged in low orbits to intercept ballistic missiles on short notice. The potential for low-latency communication was also recognized, and development offshoots in the 1990s led to numerous commercial LEO systems using fewer than 100 satellites, such as Celestri, Iridium, and Globalstar. Teledesic proposed a broadband "Internet in the Sky," similar to Starlink, with 840 satellites. However, some of those entities, including Iridium and Globalstar, went bankrupt. Teledesic voluntarily wound down operations due to financing challenges in the wake of the dot-com bubble burst.

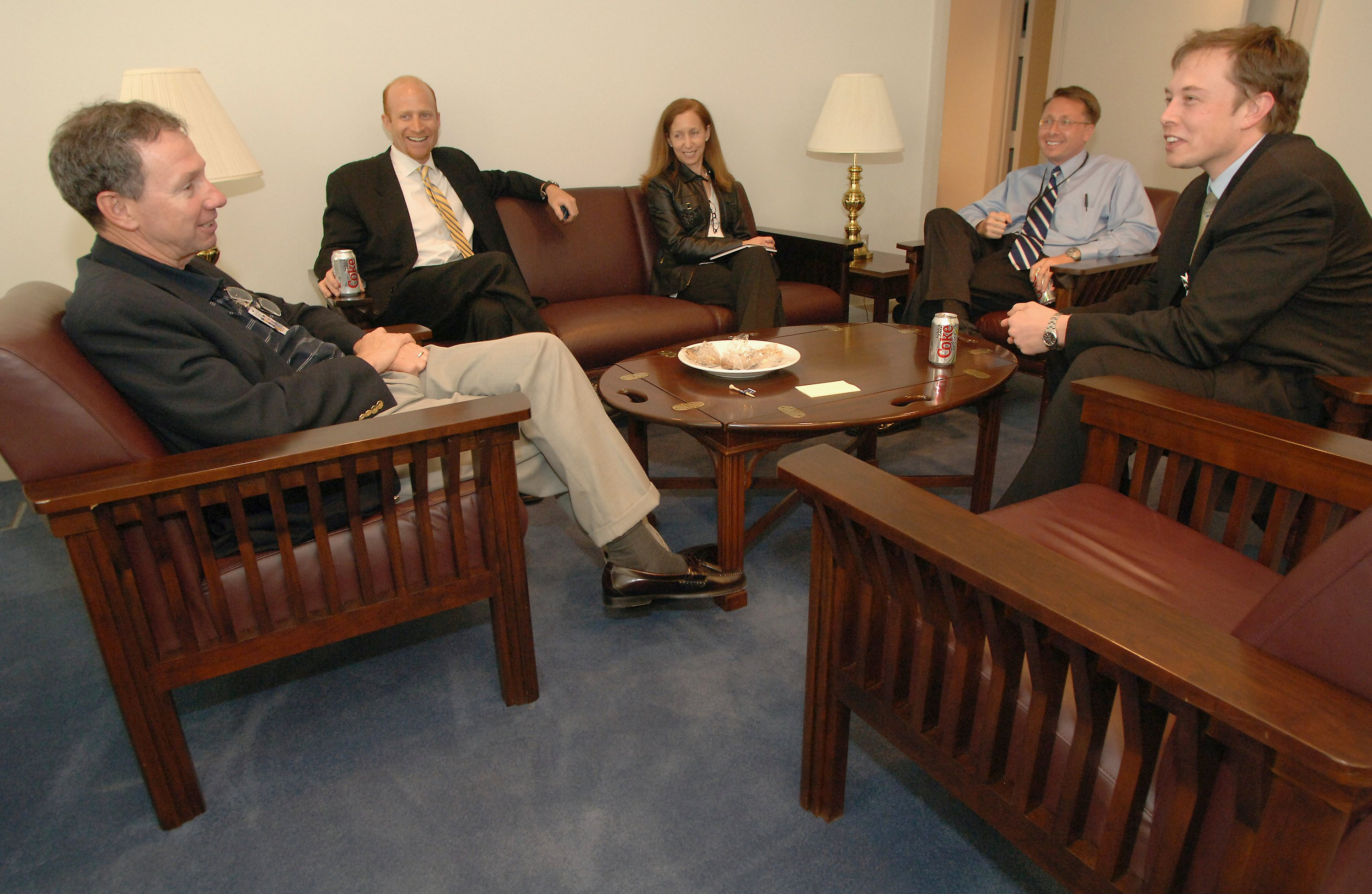
Musk and Larry Williams meet with Michael D. Griffin, long-time proponent of low Earth orbit constellations for military purposes (2005).

In 2004, Larry Williams, SpaceX VP of Strategic Relations and former VP of Teledesic, opened the SpaceX Washington DC office. That June, SpaceX acquired a 10% stake in Surrey Satellite Technology (SSTL) as part of a "shared strategic vision". SSTL was at that time working to extend the Internet into space. However, SpaceX's stake was sold back to EADS Astrium in 2008 after SSTL became more focused on navigation and Earth observation.

In early 2014, Elon Musk and Greg Wyler worked together planning a constellation of around 700 satellites called WorldVu, which would be over 10 times the size of the then-largest constellation, Iridium. However, these discussions broke down in June 2014, and SpaceX instead filed an International Telecommunication Union (ITU) application via the Norwegian Communications Authority under the name STEAM. SpaceX confirmed the connection in the 2016 application to license Starlink with the Federal Communications Commission (FCC). In August 2017, SpaceX applied to trademark the name Starlink in the United States for its satellite broadband network; the name was inspired by the 2012 novel The Fault in Our Stars.

=== Design phase (2015–2016) ===
Starlink was publicly announced in January 2015 with the opening of the SpaceX satellite development facility in Redmond, Washington. During the opening, Musk stated there is still significant unmet demand worldwide for low-cost broadband capabilities, and that Starlink would target bandwidth to carry up to 50% of all backhaul communications traffic, and up to 10% of local Internet traffic, in high-density cities. Musk further stated that the positive cash flow from selling satellite internet services would be necessary to fund SpaceX's Mars plans. Furthermore, SpaceX has long-term plans to develop and deploy a version of the satellite communication system to serve Mars.

Starting with 60 engineers, the company operated in 2,800 m^{2} (30,000 sq ft) of leased space, and by January 2017 had taken on a 2,800 m^{2} (30,000 sq ft) second facility, also in Redmond. In August 2018, SpaceX consolidated all their Seattle-area operations with a move to a larger three-building facility at Redmond Ridge Corporate Center to support satellite manufacturing in addition to research and development. In July 2016, SpaceX acquired an additional 740 m^{2} (8,000 sq ft) creative space in Irvine, California. The Irvine office would include signal processing, radio-frequency integrated circuit (RFIC), and application-specific integrated circuit (ASIC) development for the satellite program.

By October 2016, the satellite division was focusing on the significant business challenge of achieving a sufficiently low-cost design for the user equipment. SpaceX President Gwynne Shotwell said at the time that the project remained in the "design phase as the company seeks to tackle issues related to user-terminal cost".

=== Start of development phase (2016–2019) ===
In November 2016, SpaceX applied to the FCC for a license to operate a "non-geostationary orbit (NGSO) satellite system in the fixed-satellite service using the Ku- and Ka- frequency bands". In September 2017, the FCC granted a license that required half of the constellation to be in orbit within six years and that the full system would be operating within nine years from the date of the license.

SpaceX filed documents in late 2017 with the FCC to clarify their space debris mitigation plan, under which the company was to:

implement an operations plan for the orderly de-orbit of satellites nearing the end of their useful lives (roughly five to seven years) at a rate far faster than is required under international standards. [Satellites] will de-orbit by propulsively moving to a disposal orbit from which they will re-enter the Earth's atmosphere within approximately one year after completion of their mission.

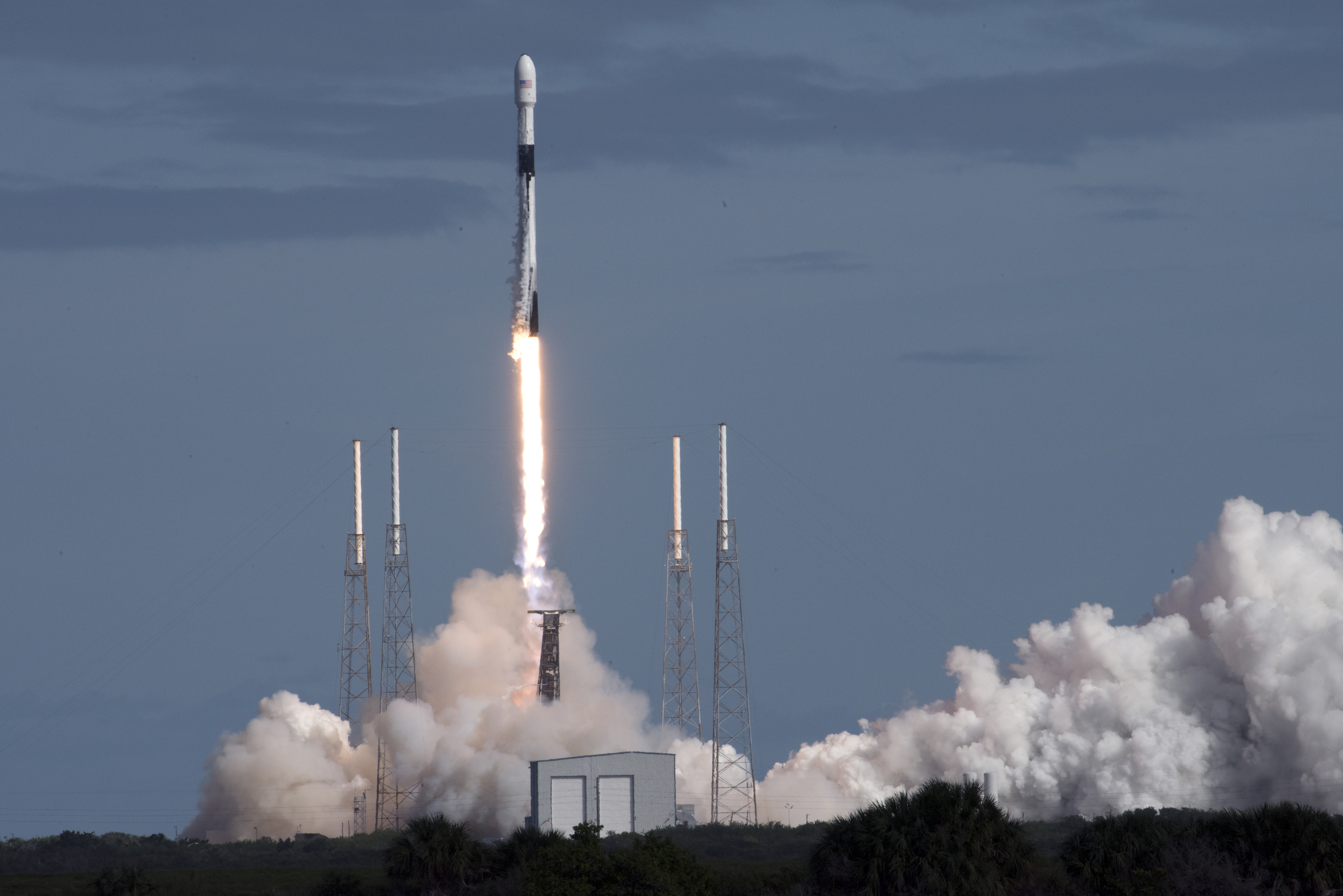
Falcon 9 lifts off from Cape Canaveral Air Force Station (CCAFS), Florida, delivering 60 Starlink satellites to orbit on November 11, 2019.

In March 2018, the FCC granted SpaceX approval for the initial 4,425 satellites, with some conditions. SpaceX would need to obtain a separate approval from the United Nations' International Telecommunication Union (ITU). The FCC supported a NASA request to ask SpaceX to achieve an even higher level of de-orbiting reliability than the standard that NASA had previously used for itself: reliably de-orbiting 90% of the satellites after their missions are complete.

In January 2017, SpaceX expected annual revenue from Starlink to reach $12 billion by 2022 and exceed $30 billion by 2025. In May 2018, SpaceX expected the total cost of development and buildout of the constellation to approach $10 billion (equivalent to $1.26×10^{10} in 2025).

In mid-2018, SpaceX reorganized the satellite development division in Redmond and terminated several members of senior management.

=== First launches (2019–2020) ===
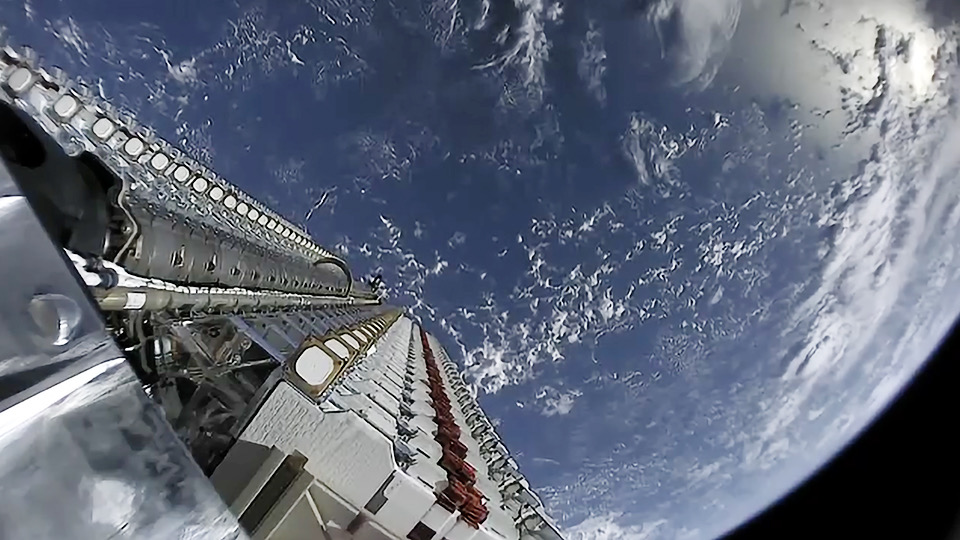
The first batch of 60 Starlink satellites stacked together before deployment on May 24, 2019

After launching two test satellites in February 2018, the first batch of 60 operational Starlink satellites was launched on May 24, 2019.

By late 2019, SpaceX was transitioning their satellite efforts from research and development to manufacturing, with the planned first launch of a large group of satellites to orbit, and the clear need to achieve an average launch rate of "44 high-performance, low-cost spacecraft built and launched every month for the next 60 months" to get the 2,200 satellites launched to support their FCC spectrum allocation license assignment. SpaceX said they would meet the deadline of having half the constellation "in orbit within six years of authorization... and the full system in nine years".

By July 2020, Starlink's limited beta internet service was opened to invitees from the public. Invitees had to sign non-disclosure agreements, and were only charged $2 per month to test out billing services. In October 2020 a wider public beta was launched, where beta testers were charged the full monthly cost and could speak freely about their experience. Starlink beta testers reported speeds over 150 Mbit/s, above the range announced for the public beta test.

=== Commercial service (2021–present) ===
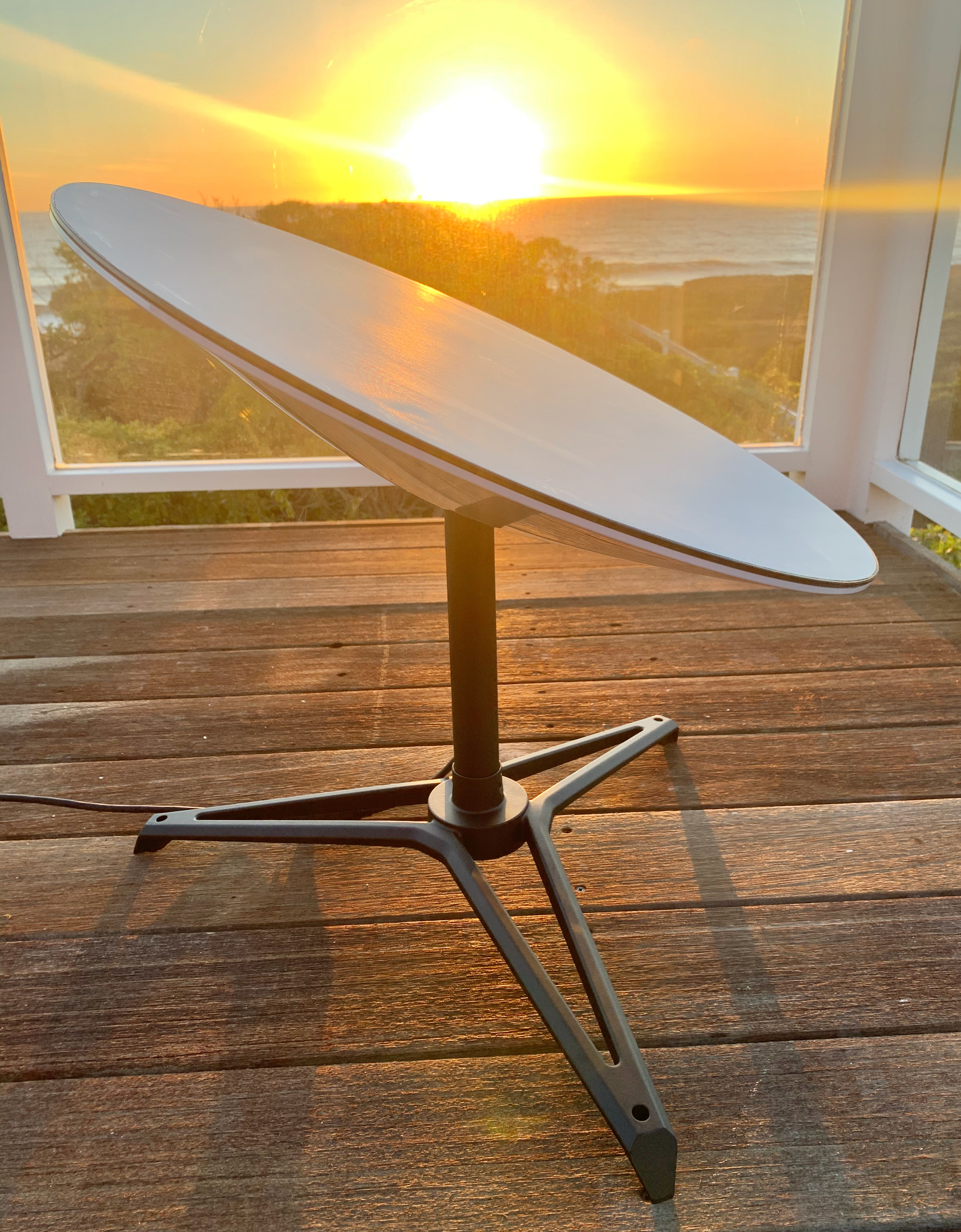
Early Starlink user terminal with dish in early 2021

Pre-orders were first opened to the public in the United States and Canada in early 2021.

The FCC had earlier awarded SpaceX with $885.5 million worth of federal subsidies from the Rural Digital Opportunity Fund (RDOF) to support rural broadband customers in 35 U.S. states through Starlink, but the subsidies were revoked in August 2022, with the FCC stating that Starlink "failed to demonstrate" its ability to deliver the promised service. SpaceX later appealed the decision saying they met or surpassed all RDOF deployment requirements that existed during bidding and that the FCC created "new standards that no bidder could meet today". In December 2023, the FCC formally denied SpaceX's appeal since "Starlink had not shown that it was reasonably capable of fulfilling RDOF's requirements to deploy a network of the scope, scale, and size" required to win the subsidy.

In March 2021, SpaceX submitted an application to the FCC for mobile variations of their terminal designed for vehicles, vessels and aircraft, and in June the company applied to the FCC to use mobile Starlink transceivers on launch vehicles flying to Earth orbit, after having tested high-altitude low-velocity mobile use on a rocket prototype in May 2021. The FCC approved the application in June 2022. Starlink had an annual loss in 2021.

In 2022, SpaceX announced the Starlink Business service tier, a higher-performance version of the service. It provides a larger high-performance antenna and listed speeds of between 150 and 500 Mbit/s with a cost of $2500 for the antenna and a $500 monthly service fee. The service includes 24/7, prioritized support. Deliveries were advertised to begin in the second quarter of 2022. Starlink terminal production was delayed by the 2020–2023 global chip shortage, and only signed up 5,000 subscribers for the last two months of 2021. Revenues from Starlink in 2022 were reportedly $1.4 billion, accompanied by a net loss. The Starlink business unit had a single cash-flow-positive quarter during 2022.

On December 1, 2022, the FCC issued an approval for SpaceX to launch the initial 7500 satellites for its second-generation (Gen2) constellation, in three low-Earth-orbit orbital shells, at 525, 530, and 535 km (326, 329 and 332 miles) altitude. Overall, SpaceX had requested approval for as many as 29,988 Gen2 satellites, with approximately 10,000 in the 525–535 km (326–332 mi) altitude shells, plus approximately 20,000 in 340–360 km (210–220 mi) shells and nearly 500 in the 604–614 km (375–382 mi) shells. The FCC noted that this was not a net increase in approved on-orbit satellites for SpaceX, since SpaceX was no longer planning to deploy 7518 V-band satellites at 340 km (210 mi) altitude that had previously been authorized.

In March 2023, the company reported that they were manufacturing six Starlink "v2 mini" satellites per day as well as thousands of user terminals. The v2 mini had Gen2 Starlink satellite features while being assembled in a smaller form factor than the larger Gen2 satellites. The Gen2 satellites required the 9 meters (30 feet) diameter Starship in order to launch them.

According to financial statements reported by Wccftech, Starlink Satellite Services, a SpaceX subsidiary that distributes Starlink services, recorded a net profit of $72.7 million in 2024.

In November 2024, SpaceX proposed a constellation of Starlink satellites around Mars, referred to as "Marslink". The proposed system would be capable of providing more than 4 Mbit/s of bandwidth between Earth and Mars, as well as imaging services.

In March 2025, the director of the United States Department of Commerce's rural broadband program resigned, citing undue emphasis on Starlink from the Trump administration. Also in March, the Department of Government Efficiency (DOGE) installed a Starlink user terminal at the White House complex which raised conflict of interest concerns. In response the White House said that the terminal was donated by Starlink and approved by legal counsel and the United States Secret Service.

=== International concerns ===
Tensions between Brazil and Elon Musk's business ventures escalated in 2024 as the country's telecom regulator Anatel threatened to sanction Starlink after Brazil's top court upheld a ban on X, Musk's social media platform. Brazil's President Lula supported the decision, citing X's role in allegedly spreading hate and misinformation undermining Brazil's democracy. Brazilian judge Alexandre de Moraes froze Starlink's accounts, and Starlink refused to comply with a court order to block domestic access to X until the freeze was lifted, risking its license to operate.

The Wall Street Journal reported in October 2024 that Musk had been in regular contact with Russian President Vladimir Putin and other high ranking Russian government officials since late 2022, discussing personal topics, business and geopolitical matters. The Journal reported that Putin had asked Musk to avoid activating his Starlink satellite system over Taiwan, to appease Chinese Communist Party general secretary Xi Jinping. The communications were reported to be a closely held secret in government, given Musk's involvement in promoting the presidential candidacy of Donald Trump, and his security clearance to access classified government information. One person said no alerts were raised by the U.S. government, noting the dilemma of the government being dependent on Musk's technologies. Musk initially voiced support for Ukraine's defense against Russia's 2022 invasion by donating Starlink terminals, but made later decisions to limit Ukrainian access to Starlink, which coincided with Russian pressure in public and in private. In a November 2024 call with President Volodymyr Zelenskyy, Musk said he will continue supporting Ukraine through Starlink.

In 2024, SpaceX asked its numerous Taiwanese suppliers to move production abroad, citing geopolitical risk concerns. This move was questioned by the Taiwanese government and resulted in significant anger from the Taiwanese public, with some pointing out that Starlink was unavailable in Taiwan despite its suppliers providing the underlying technology, and others calling for a boycott of Tesla products.

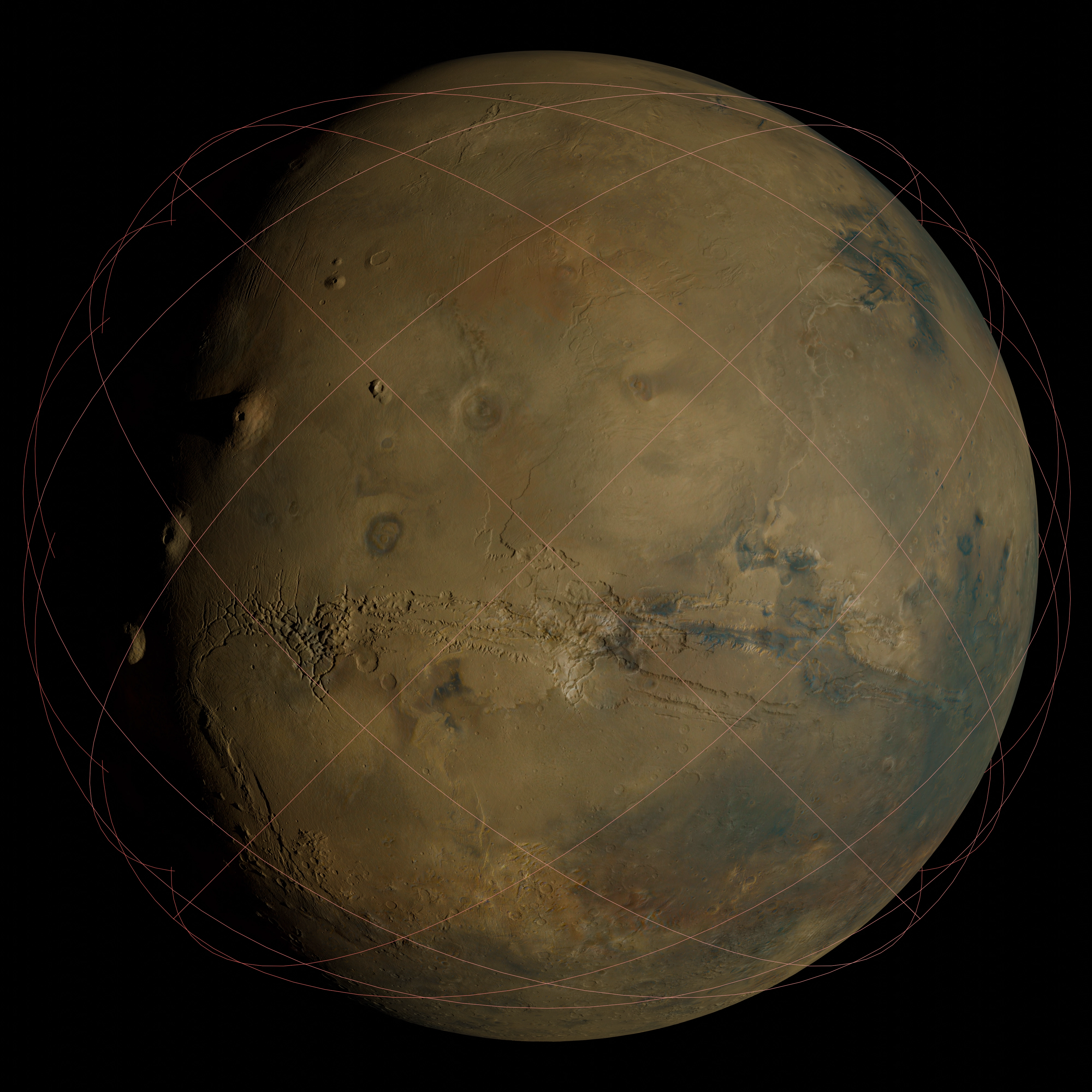
Marslink walker-delta constellation concept

Starting in July 2024, SpaceX began conducting tests on Starlink in cooperation with the Romanian Ministry of National Defense and National Authority for Communications Administration and Regulation (ANCOM). These tests aim at demonstrating that the Equivalent Power Flux Density (EPFD) limit can be safely increased, thus improving the speed and coverage area of Starlink, without affecting classic, geostationary satellites. The results of these tests will be used to help change a rule set by the International Telecommunication Union in the 1990s regarding the limits of non-geostationary satellites.

In February 2025, Starlink was part of an investigation by USAID into the agency's oversight of Starlink terminals provided to the Ukrainian government, when USAID's Inspector General was fired by President Trump and all employees put on administrative leave. The USAID website was scrubbed of all information related to the Starlink probe.

In March 2025, Musk's involvement in politics was protested by a number of Starlink customers in the U.K.

In May 2025, after the Trump administration launched a series of tariffs, the State Department pushed countries to approve American satellite companies, including Starlink.

== Services ==
=== Satellite internet ===
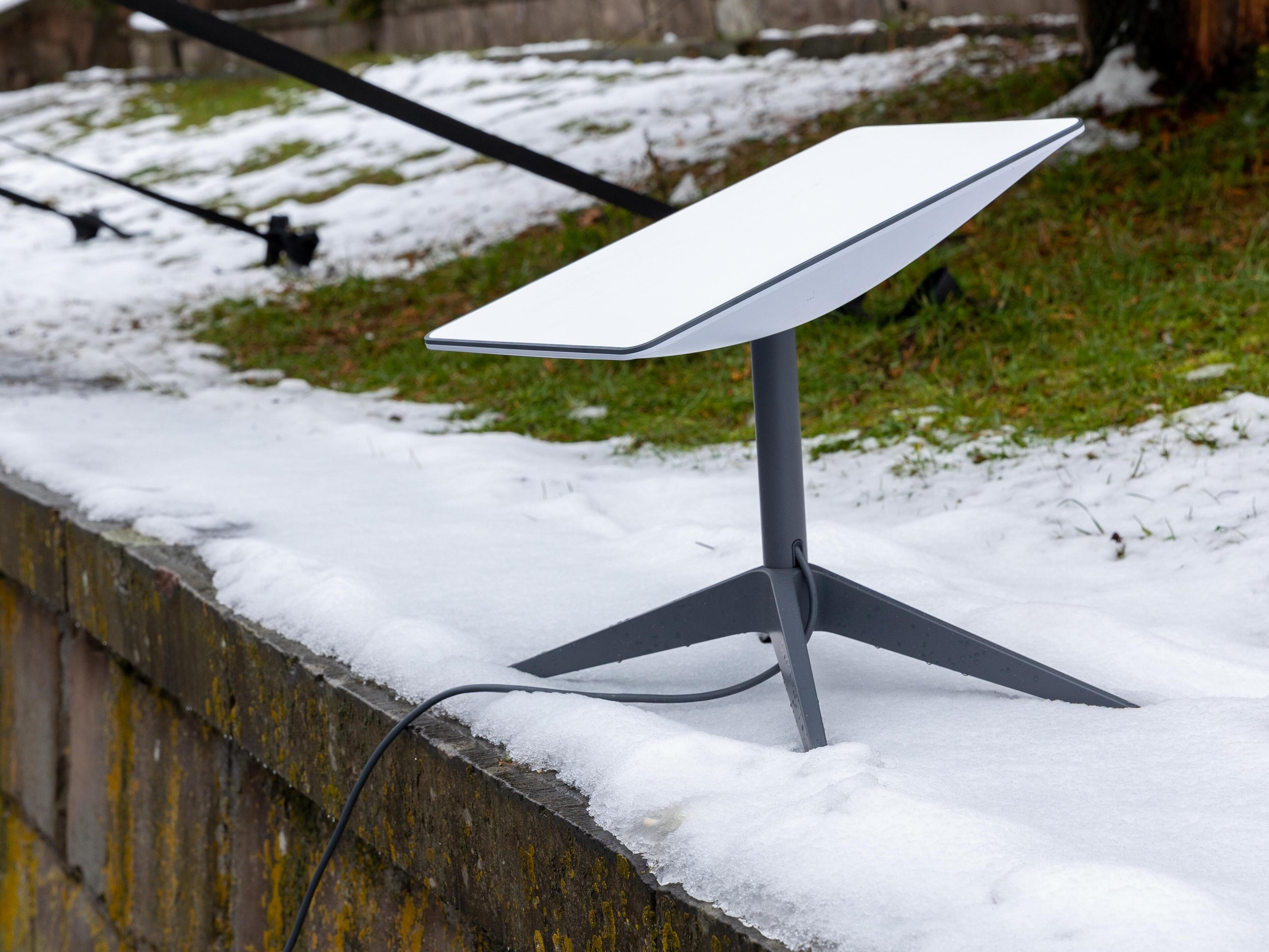
Antenna on the ground

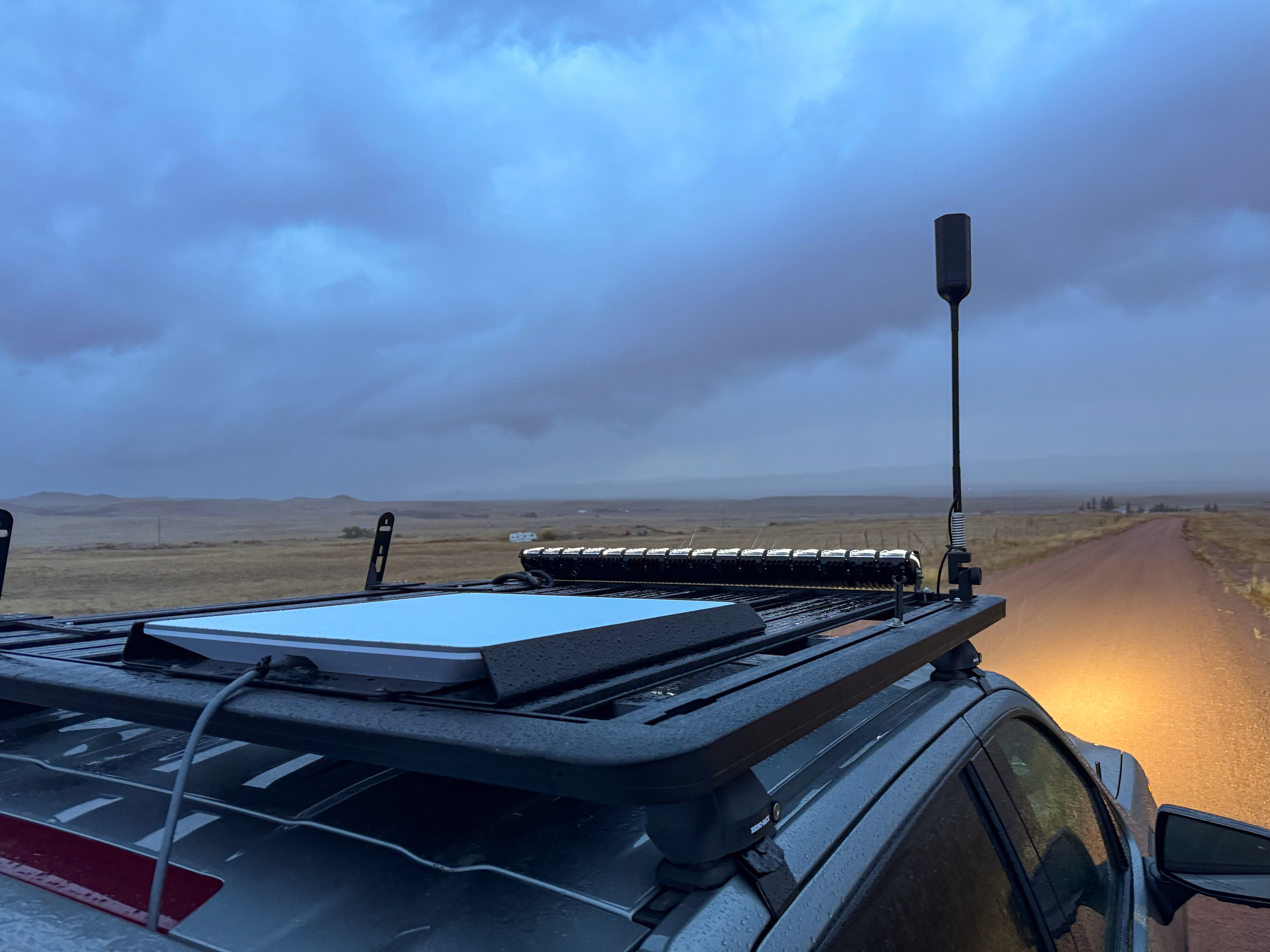
Antenna on the roof of a truck

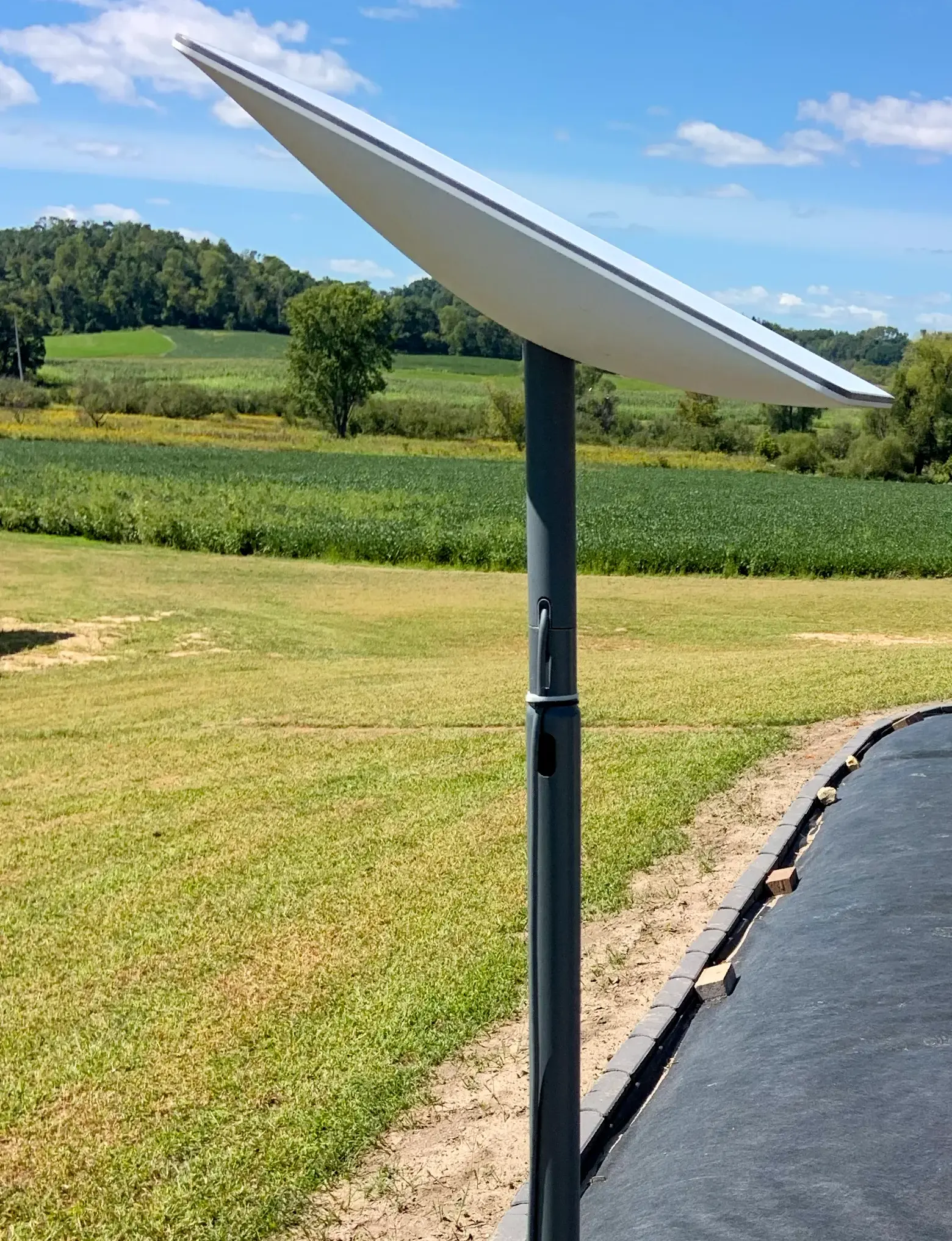
Pole mounted

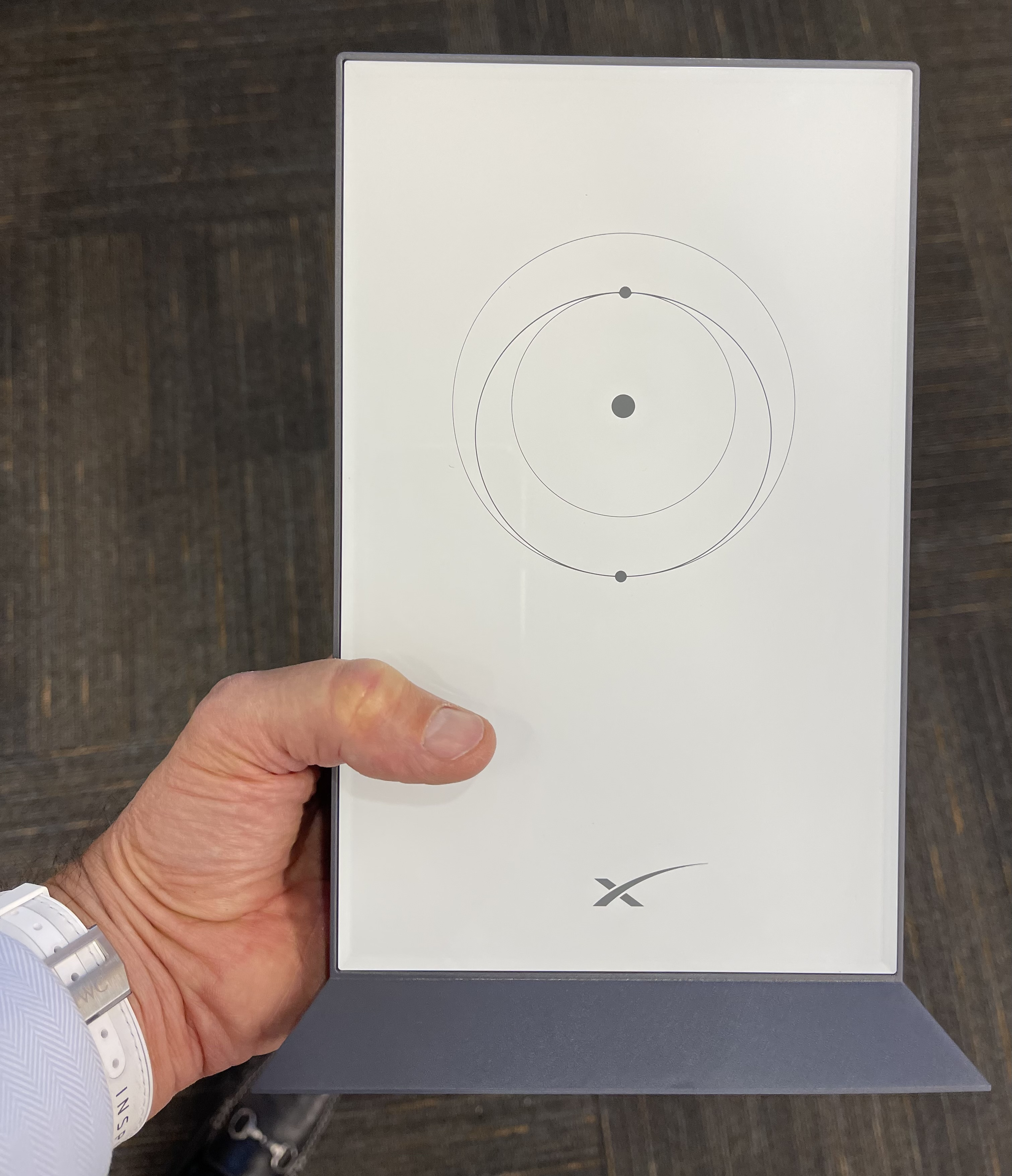
Starlink user terminal (WiFi router and gateway)

Starlink provides satellite-based internet connectivity to underserved and remote areas, while also competing with terrestrial broadband providers in urban and suburban markets. Starlink also offers mobile connectivity services for uses such as recreational vehicles, maritime vessels, and aviation. Terminals for these markets maintain connectivity while in motion.

Service speeds and latency vary based on network load, location, and service plan. Typical latency is less than that of traditional geostationary satellite internet systems because Starlink's satellites operate in low Earth orbit. Independent testing has shown that performance has varied over time as subscriber growth, satellite deployment, and network upgrades have altered available network capacity.

Because satellite capacity is shared among users within a geographic area, Starlink has implemented network-management policies in some markets. These have included waitlists in high-demand regions, deprioritized service tiers, and data-priority systems intended to manage congestion during periods of heavy network utilization.

Pricing varies by country, service tier, and intended use. SpaceX has periodically adjusted prices in response to regional demand and network capacity, including reducing prices in markets where available capacity exceeded demand. Starlink introduced a monthly 1 TB data cap for all non-business users which was enforced starting in 2023. However, Starlink throttling allegedly began after 5TB of usage in September 2026.

==== Subscribers ====
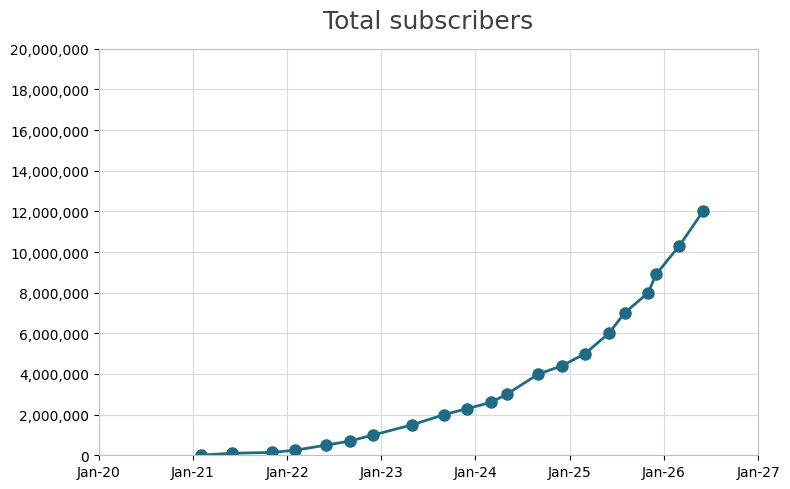
Plot of Starlink subscribers

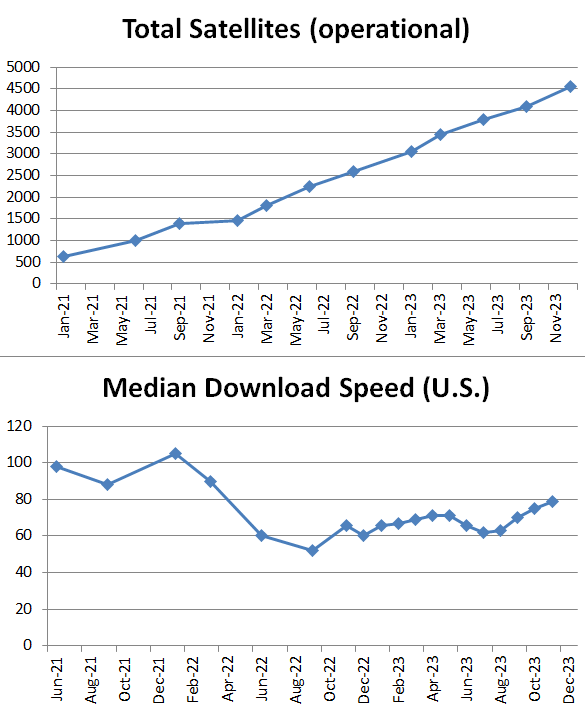
Number of Starlink satellites and user median download speed (in Mbit/s)

A Starlink subscriber is counted as one active service line. A service line is one internet subscription—usually linked to a specific terminal—and billed under Starlink's standard personal and standard business plans. One service line counts as one subscriber, even if multiple people use it. Likewise, one person or business can have multiple service lines, which are counted separately. It does not include large enterprise or government contracts.

Prior to SpaceX's initial public offering, Starlink used the words "customers", "subscribers", and "people" without providing the definitions.

Year	Approx. Subscribers	ARPU	Ref
February 2021	10,000		
June 2021	100,000		
November 2021	140,000		
February 2022	250,000		
June 2022	500,000		
September 2022	700,000		
December 2022	1,000,000		
May 2023	1,500,000		
September 2023	2,000,000		
December 2023	2,300,000	$99	
March 2024	2,600,000		
May 2024	3,000,000		
September 2024	4,000,000		
December 2024	4,400,000	$91	
March 2025	5,000,000	$86	
June 2025	6,000,000		
August 2025	7,000,000		
November 2025	8,000,000		
December 2025	8,900,000	$81	
March 2026	10,300,000	$66	
June 2026	12,000,000		
September 2026	13,600,000		

=== Starlink Mobile ===
The direct-to-cell service uses Starlink satellites equipped to connect with standard mobile phones without specialized satellite equipment built-in. Performance varies depending on network load, location, and spectrum availability, with limited capacity compared to terrestrial mobile networks.

T-Mobile US and SpaceX launched the first commercial implementation in the United States, using T-Mobile midband PCS spectrum to provide coverage in areas without terrestrial mobile service. Initial service supports SMS text messaging, with planned expansion to voice and limited data. The system is designed to work with existing LTE-compatible devices. On January 8, 2024, SpaceX reported successful SMS testing of the system on T-Mobile's network.

In April 2023, Rogers Communications announced an agreement with SpaceX to explore satellite-to-phone services in Canada. One NZ announced a partnership in the same month to extend mobile coverage across New Zealand, with SMS service expected in 2024 and voice and data in 2025. In July 2023, Optus announced a similar partnership in Australia. On August 12, 2025, Ukrainian operator Kyivstar conducted a test of the service, with a commercial launch planned for 2025.

In September 2025, SpaceX announced that they were acquiring all of EchoStar's AWS-4 (MSS) and AWS-H spectrum.

In March 2026, SpaceX announced that they were re-branding Starlink direct-to-cell as "Starlink Mobile".

In October 2026, SpaceX announced that they were acquiring nationwide 800 MHz spectrum from investment firm Grain Management. They noted that this "will pave the way for Starlink Mobile to become a major mobile carrier in the US".

==== Radio Frequency Summary ====
U.S. wireless spectrum owned by SpaceX
Frequency Band	5G NR Bands	Notes
800 MHz SMR	n26	Acquired from Grain, formerly Sprint/T-Mobile spectrum. (Pending FCC approval)
1.7/2.1 GHz AWS / MSS	n66, n70, n252 (NTN)	Acquired from Dish/EchoStar.

=== Starshield ===
In December 2022, SpaceX announced Starshield, a separate Starlink-based service designed for government and military customers. The system is intended for use by the U.S. Department of Defense and allied agencies, with options for ownership or leasing of satellites. Starshield satellites are described as supporting encrypted communications and resistance to signal jamming, and are capable of hosting a range of payloads. Starshield satellites are designed to interconnect with Starlink satellites via optical inter-satellite links.

In September 2023, the U.S. Space Force awarded the first Starshield-related contract under its Proliferated Low Earth Orbit program for satellite communications. The contract is part of a broader procurement effort involving multiple vendors for military LEO services.

== Applications ==
=== Military ===
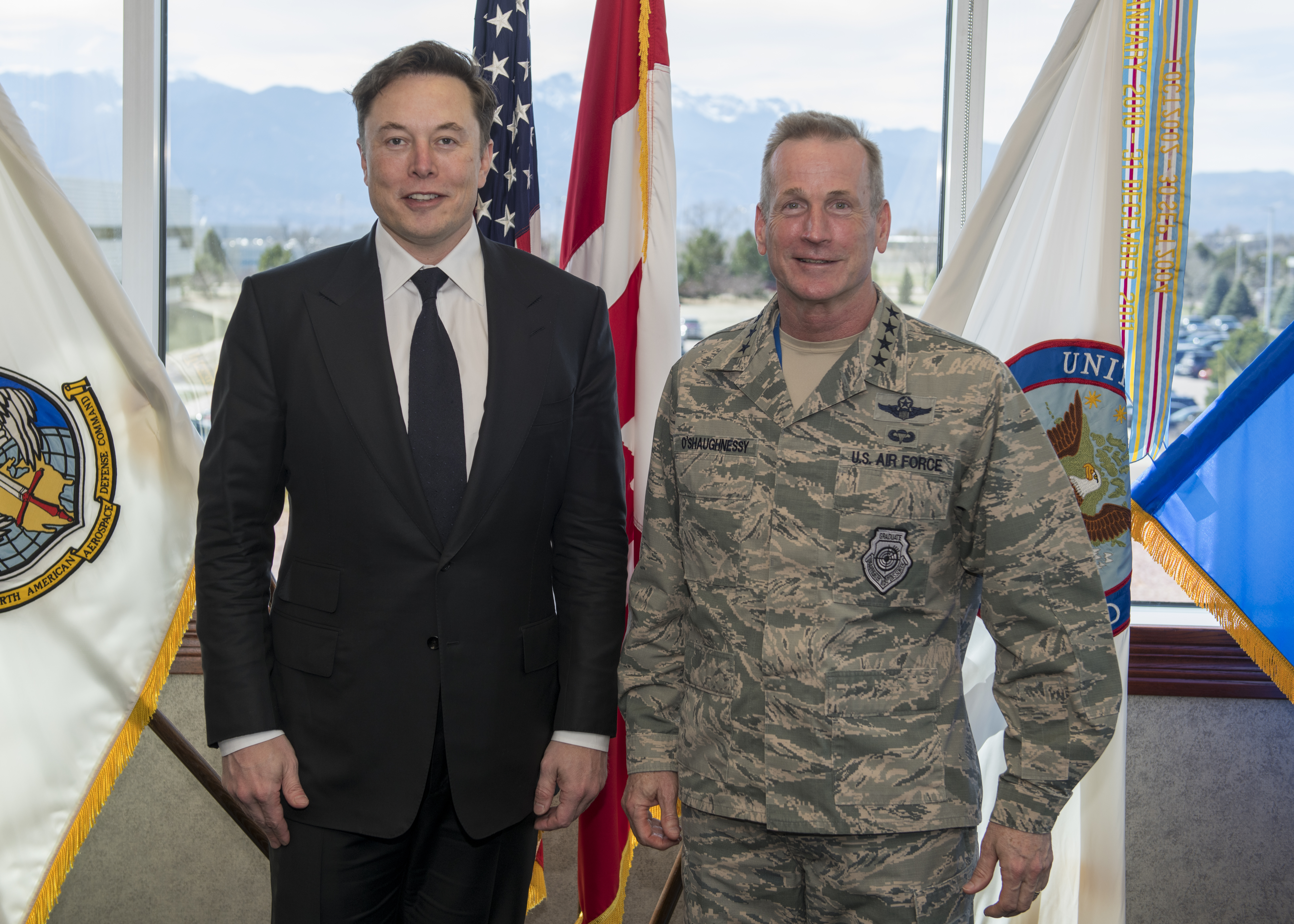
Elon Musk and (now retired) four-star general Terrence J. O'Shaughnessy meet in April 2019.

SpaceX also designs, builds, and launches customized military satellites based on variants of the Starlink satellite bus, with the largest publicly known customer being the Space Development Agency (SDA).

SDA accelerates development of missile defense capabilities, primarily via observation platforms, using industry-procured low-cost low Earth orbit satellite platforms.

In October 2020, SDA awarded SpaceX an initial $150 million dual-use contract to develop 4 satellites to detect and track ballistic and hypersonic missiles. The first batch of satellites were originally scheduled to launch September 2022 to form part of the Tracking Layer Tranche 0 of the U.S. Space Force's National Defense Space Architecture (NDSA), a network of satellites performing various roles including missile tracking. The launch schedule slipped multiple times but eventually launched in April 2023.

In 2020, SpaceX hired retired four-star general Terrence J. O'Shaughnessy who, according to some sources, is associated with Starlink's military satellite development, and according to one source, is listed as a "chief operating officer" at SpaceX. While still on active duty, O'Shaughnessy advocated before the United States Senate Committee on Armed Services for a layered capability with lethal follow-on that incorporates machine learning and artificial intelligence to gather and act upon sensor data quickly.

SpaceX did not bid for a contract for the larger Tranche 1, with awards going to York Space Systems, Lockheed Martin Space, and Northrop Grumman Space Systems.

==== Military communications ====
In 2019, tests by the United States Air Force Research Laboratory (AFRL) demonstrated a 610 Mbit/s data link through Starlink to a Beechcraft C-12 Huron aircraft in flight. Additionally, in late 2019, the United States Air Force successfully tested a connection with Starlink on an AC-130 Gunship.

In 2020, the Air Force used Starlink in support of its Advanced Battlefield management system during a live-fire exercise. They demonstrated Starlink connected to a "variety of air and terrestrial assets" including the Boeing KC-135 Stratotanker.

Expert on battlefield communications Thomas Wellington has argued that Starlink signals, because they use narrow focused beams, are less vulnerable to interference and jamming by the enemy in wartime than satellites flying in higher orbits.

In May 2022, Chinese military researchers published an article in a peer-reviewed journal describing a strategy for destroying the Starlink constellation if they threaten national security. The researchers specifically highlight concerns with reported Starlink military capabilities. Musk has declared Starlink is meant for peaceful use and has suggested Starlink could enforce peace by taking a strategic initiative. Russian officials including the head of Russia's space agency Dmitry Rogozin, have warned Elon Musk and criticized Starlink, including warning that Starlink could become a legitimate military target in the future.

==== Countermeasures ====
In response to Ukraine using Starlink in the war with Russia, in particular to guide drones and missiles to targets in Russia, Russia developed a system, named Volna Kupol Garant, to temporarily block Starlink communications. It uses high-powered transmissions that overload the Starlink receiver system, preventing it from receiving signals. Transmissions do not damage Starlink satellites, although they may take several minutes to recover after the jamming transmission is discontinued. The system was announced in August 2026. Sources vary on the size of the jamming zone, one suggesting 20 km^{2} (7.7 sq mi) and another a radius of 20 km (12 mi) (1,260 km^{2}; 490 sq mi).

==== Russo-Ukrainian war ====
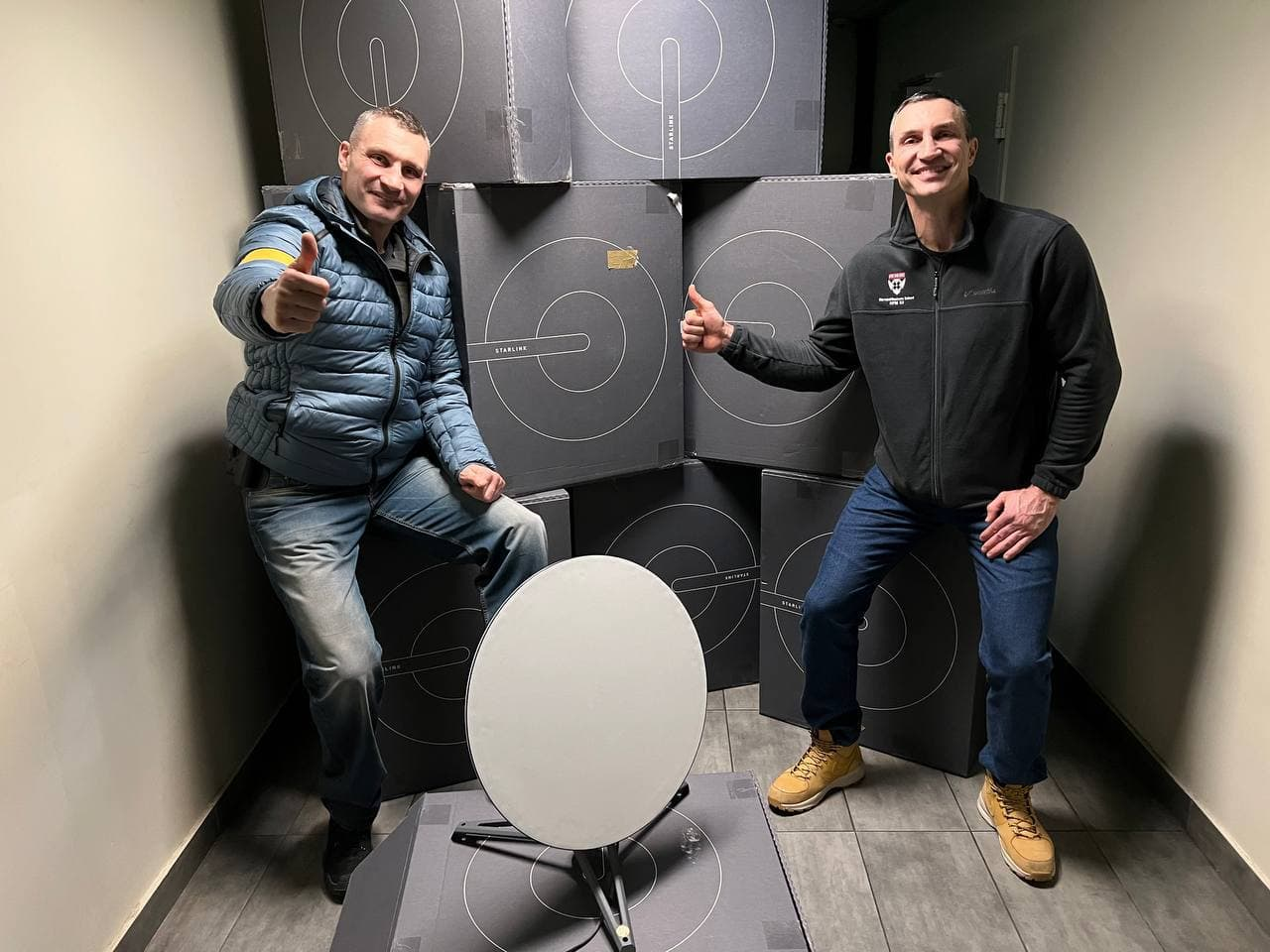
Vitali Klitschko, mayor of Kyiv, and his brother Wladimir Klitschko with Starlink terminals shipped to Kyiv during the 2022 Russian invasion of Ukraine

Starlink was activated during the Russian invasion of Ukraine, after a request from the Ukrainian government. Ukraine's military and government rapidly became dependent on Starlink to maintain Internet access. Starlink is used by Ukraine for communication, such as keeping in touch with the outside world and keeping the energy infrastructure working.

The service is also notably used for warfare. Starlink is used for connecting combat drones, naval drones, artillery fire coordination systems and attacks on Russian positions. SpaceX has expressed reservations about the offensive use of Starlink by Ukraine beyond military communications and restricted Starlink communication technology for military use on weapon systems, but has kept most of the service online. Its use in attacking Russian targets has been criticized by the Kremlin.

Musk has warned that the service was costing $20 million per month, and a Ukrainian official estimated SpaceX's contributions as over $100 million. In June 2023, the United States Department of Defense signed a contract with SpaceX to finance Starlink use in Ukraine.

On October 24, 2026, Musk claimed that the Ukrainian military had violated Starlink's terms of service by using the service for offensive drone strikes to kill people. His statement alleged that Starlink had been used in attacks that resulted in civilian casualties in Russia. This claim was denied by Ukrainian officials, who said that Starlink restrictions in Russia and speed limits of 90 km/h prevented its use for deep strikes.

==== Gaza war ====
In October 2023 after the Gaza war started, users shared the hashtag #starlinkforgaza on Elon Musk's social network X (formerly Twitter), demanding he activate Starlink in Gaza after Internet service in the region was lost. Musk answered that Starlink connectivity would be provided for aid groups in Gaza. At the end of November, Musk said the Starlink service would only be provided for Gaza with the approval of the government of Israel.

==== Mali War and War in the Sahel ====
According to the Global Initiative Against Transnational Organized Crime, jihadist groups such as the Jama'at Nasr al-Islam wal-Muslimin and Islamic State – West Africa Province have been using an illicit supply chain to acquire Starlink devices and bypass regulations on their use. The more secure communication of these devices has made it harder for government forces to intercept the plans of armed groups, allowing them to evade law enforcement and sustain illicit economies. A leader of the Union of Nigeriens for Vigilance and Patriotism, a support group for the Nigerien junta in the Agadez region, noted:

These days, every suspicious vehicle seems to carry one of these Starlink devices. The armed groups near Emi Lulu, the militias Haftar pushed out who are now hiding along the Niger border — they all rely on these devices to stay connected and coordinate their movements.

— February 2025

In response, the governments of Niger and Chad have moved to legalize Starlink in hopes of better regulating the technology by requiring registration of the devices. However, these measures are unlikely to stop the supply chain.

Starlink has also been adopted by the Azawadi separatist group, Azawad Liberation Front (FLA), as well as the armed forces of Mali. According to an FLA leader in the Tinzaouaten area, the group uses Starlink to coordinate operations, share intelligence, and communicate its narrative. In the Battle of Tinzaouaten (2024), the use of Starlink allowed the FLA to maintain secure communication across its dispersed units and release updates on social media, increasing its visibility to external audiences.

==== Iran 2026 war ====
During the 2026 Iran conflict, tensions emerged between the United States Department of Defense and SpaceX over the pricing of Starlink services used for military drone operations. SpaceX argued that LUCAS drones were operating under conditions consistent with Starlink's aviation-tier service, while Pentagon officials maintained that the pricing had been intended for aircraft rather than short-duration kamikaze drones.The dispute later resulted in the Pentagon agreeing to higher pricing terms, increasing the communications cost associated with each LUCAS drone. Discussions also expanded to the potential use of Starlink Direct-to-Cell services in Iran during internet shutdowns affecting civilian communications.

The Telegraph later reported that Elon Musk accused the Pentagon of violating Starlink's civilian-use agreements by using the network to support armed drone operations during the conflict.

=== Criminal ===
In 2023 that Brazilian organized criminal groups were making heavy use of Starlink in exploiting remote regions of the Amazon rainforest.

In February 2025, Wired and the BBC reported that Starlink is a key connectivity option for scam centers in Southeast Asia with "criminals running multi-billion-dollar empires across Southeast Asia appear to be widely using the satellite internet network." Wired identified more than one hundred Starlink devices in use at just one center, KK Park in Myanmar. SpaceX announced in October 2025, that access to at least 2,500 Starlink devices used in Myanmar scamming centers was cut off.

=== Iran ===
In Iran, Elon Musk personally announced the activation of Starlink in 2022 after the Iranian government blocked the internet to suppress the spread of anti-government protests, enabling citizens to regain uncensored access. These cases illustrate the difficulty governments face in controlling unauthorized satellite communications within their borders. The decentralized and autonomous nature of Starlink's operations presents a growing challenge to national sovereignty and cybersecurity enforcement.

Likewise during the internet blackout amidst the 2025–2026 Iranian protests, Starlink was activated in Iran. However, by January 11, the Iranian government shut down Starlink internet connectivity for the first time. The jamming and shut down led to varying degrees of success, with users occasionally being able to circumvent the censorship amidst the security forces also seizing satellite dishes to block any external access. The State Department had given SpaceX sanctions exemption to enable Starlink services in Iran, and NGOs including Holistic Resilience and ASL19 had assisted in smuggling terminals into Iran. The New York Times reported that the Iranian authorities had used GPS spoofing, causing many of the estimated 50,000 Starlink terminals to not operate.

=== Passenger Wi-Fi on aircraft ===
Several airlines have retrofitted or announced plans to retrofit aircraft with Starlink terminals to provide in-flight internet access.

On April 25, 2022, Hawaiian Airlines announced an agreement with Starlink to provide internet service on its aircraft, becoming the first airline to adopt the system.

In September 2024, United Airlines announced plans to equip its entire mainline and regional fleet with Starlink connectivity. The Federal Aviation Administration approved installation of Starlink equipment on United aircraft in March 2025.

Qatar Airways began installing Starlink terminals in October 2024. In November 2025, International Airlines Group (IAG) announced it would install Starlink terminals on around 500 aircraft of their fleet (Aer Lingus, British Airways, Iberia, Level and Vueling). British Airways was the first IAG airline to fly with Starlink installed in March 2026. Also in November 2025, Emirates followed, announcing installations on all 230 aircraft of their active fleet. In December 2025, Hanjin Group announced a deal to install Starlink terminals on all aircraft of their fleet, consisting of Korean Air, Asiana Airlines, Air Busan, Air Seoul and Jin Air. In January 2026, Lufthansa Group announced Starlink would be installed on all around 850 aircraft of their fleet (including Lufthansa, Austrian Airlines, Brussels Airlines, ITA Airways, Swiss International Air Lines, Air Dolomiti, Edelweiss Air, Eurowings, and Discover Airlines).

Other airlines who have announced deals with Starlink include Zipair Tokyo in January 2023, Air France in September 2024, WestJet in July 2024 and Air New Zealand in December 2023, airBaltic in February 2025, SAS in May 2025, Virgin Atlantic in July 2025, Alaska Airlines in August 2025, Air Canada in September 2025, FlyDubai in November 2025, Gulf Air in January 2026, Southwest Airlines in February 2026. Singapore Airlines and American Airlines in May 2026, Wizz Air and El Al in June 2026, and Frontier Airlines, Cebu Pacific, Volaris, Copa Airlines JetSmart in July 2026, VietJet Air in September 2026, Royal Air Maroc,KLM and EasyJet in October 2026, and Air Tahiti Nui in November 2026.

=== Maritime ===
Within the shipping and cruise industries, Starlink allows location-independent access to telecommunications for crew and passengers.

Starlink has a 97.6% market share of the commercially operated maritime vessels of the LEO connected market as of August 2026. This dominance was built on rapid adoption across both cargo and passenger fleets. In August 2022, SpaceX secured its first contract for services in the passenger shipping industry. Royal Caribbean Group added Starlink internet to its Freedom of the Seas liner. By November 2025, Royal Caribbean had installed Starlink on all vessels of its fleet. Carnival Corporation & plc added Starlink in 2024. Viking, Disney Cruise Line, Norwegian Cruise Line Holdings added the service in 2023 and MSC Cruises, Virgin Voyages, and TUI Cruises added it in 2024. Cargo ship lines that have installed Starlink internet on their vessels include Maersk, Hapag-Lloyd, Hyundai Glovis, Korea Line, SK Shipping and Pan Ocean.

== Internet availability and regulatory approval ==
Starlink availability, October 2026 Active Active without approval Approved and pending activation Not covered

The Starlink network has near-global reach, including the polar caps; broadband service is available in approximately 160 countries and territories.

SpaceX formally requested authorization for Canada in June 2020, the Canadian regulatory authority approved it in November 2020, and SpaceX rolled out service two months later, in January 2021. By September 2022, Starlink services were on offer in 40 countries, with applications pending regulatory approval in many more.

Starlink satellites passing over the Swiss night sky as seen from Mürren

The ISEDC allowed Canada to become the first foreign country to approve the service with regulatory approval for the Starlink low Earth orbit satellite constellation on November 6, 2020.

In May 2022, Starlink entered the Philippine market, the company's first deployment in Asia, because of a landmark legislative change (RA 11659, Public Services Act) about all-foreign allowance of company ownership in regard to utility entities such as Internet and telco companies. Starlink got provisional permission from the country's collection of regulators and soon began commercial services, aimed at regions with lower Internet connectivity.

In June 2023, a license to offer Internet services in Zambia was granted to Starlink by the Zambian Government authorities, after the completion of many trial projects throughout the country. In October 2023, Starlink officially went live in Zambia.

In July 2023, the Mongolian government issued two licenses to SpaceX to provide Internet access in the country.

In July 2023, it was reported by Bloomberg that attempts to sell the service to Taiwan in 2022 fell through when SpaceX insisted on 100% ownership of the Taiwan subsidiary running Starlink in the country. This went against Taiwanese law that required that Internet service providers (ISP) are at least 51% controlled by local companies, an impracticality when dealing with a globe-spanning ISP.

Japan's major mobile provider, KDDI, announced a partnership with SpaceX to begin offering in 2022 expanded connectivity for its rural mobile customers via 1,200 remote mobile towers.

On April 25, 2022, Hawaiian Airlines announced an agreement with Starlink to provide free Internet access on its aircraft, becoming the first airline to use Starlink. By July 2022, Starlink Internet service was available in 36 countries and 41 markets.

In May 2022, it was announced that regulatory approval had been granted for Nigeria, Mozambique, and the Philippines. In the Philippines, commercial availability began on February 22, 2023.

In September 2022, trials began at McMurdo Station in Antarctica and from December 2022 on field missions. Antarctica has no ground stations, so polar-orbiting satellites with optical interlinks are used to connect to ground stations in South America, New Zealand, and Australia.

In September 2023, the US-based United Against Nuclear Iran started donating subscriptions and terminals to Iranians to allow them to circumvent Iran's Internet blackout.

In September 2023, it was reported by some Indian news outlets that Starlink would imminently receive its license to operate in India after Starlink was able to meet all regulatory requirements, but that it would still be required to apply for spectrum allocation in order to provide service. SpaceX had earlier sold 5000 Starlink preorders in India, and in 2021 had announced that Sanjay Bhargava, who had worked with Musk as part of a team that founded electronic payment firm PayPal, would head the tech billionaire entrepreneur's Starlink satellite broadband venture in India. Three months later, Bhargava resigned "for personal reasons" after the Indian government ordered SpaceX to halt selling preorders for Starlink service until SpaceX gained regulatory approval for providing satellite Internet services in the country. In April 2024, it was reported in some Indian news outlets that Starlink had received its "in-principle government approval" and that the approval now "lies at the desk of communications minister Ashwini Vaishnaw".

In November 2023, Starlink received the licenses to operate in Fiji. The service was launched in Fiji in May 2024.

In April 2024, it was reported that the company would begin trial service in Indonesia in May. Starlink received its license to operate in Indonesia in early May.

In May 2024, Starlink service was made available for pre-order in Sri Lanka, pending regulatory approval from the Telecommunications Regulatory Commission of Sri Lanka (TRCSL). In August 2024, Starlink Lanka (Private) Limited was granted a Telecommunications Service Provider License by TRCSL, allowing it to operate satellite Internet services in the country. However, in March 2025, the government placed the rollout on hold due to concerns over the absence of lawful interception provisions in the license, which were required for national security reasons. By June 2, 2025, the Deputy Minister of Technology confirmed that all regulatory conditions had been fulfilled, including the integration of oversight mechanisms, clearing the way for the launch. Starlink officially launched its services in Sri Lanka on July 2, 2025.

In April 2025, Starlink's license was approved by National Communication Authority in Somalia. In August 2024, Starlink received the licenses to operate in Yemen. Starlink services were to be offered through the company's sales points distributed across most governorates. These points will provide a full range of services, including device sales, activation, subscription fee payments, and direct technical support. In April 2025, Houthi rebels in Yemen demanded that residents surrender their Starlink devices.

In September 2024, United Airlines announced it would install Starlink services on the airline's entire fleet, including mainland and regional aircraft, as part of a plan to offer free high-speed Wi-Fi to all passengers. In March 2025, the FAA issued final approval for United to begin equipping its aircraft with Starlink antennas.

On October 22, 2024, Qatar Airways launched the first Starlink-equipped Boeing 777 flight, flying from Doha to London.

On March 11 and 12, 2025, Indian telecom companies Airtel and Jio have partnered with Starlink to bring satellite Internet to India, aiming to improve connectivity in remote areas. However, the service's rollout is dependent on securing necessary government approvals. These partnerships promise to expand broadband access, especially in underserved regions.

Although Starlink was officially unavailable in South Africa, it was found in June 2025 that Starlink has been operating unlawfully in South Africa since 2022. It was reported that South Africans have been able to use Starlink's roaming service for nearly two and a half years as a workaround to the lack of official local support. In June 2025 Starlink began notifiying its users of its Roam Unlimited and Global Roaming plans in South Africa that their service had been suspended. Earlier in March 2025, Musk claimed that "Starlink can't get a license to operate in South Africa simply because I'm not black". Musk's claim, which likely references the provisions of the South African Electronic Communications Act, 2005, which require telecom licensees to allocate at least 30% equity ownership to historically disadvantaged groups, has been disputed by officials within the South African government.

In February 2026, Starlink received the licences from the Vietnamese Ministry of Science and Technology to operate fixed and mobile satellite networks in Vietnam, through its local unit headquartered in Hanoi. It is expected that Starlink will deploy four ground gateway stations and provide satellite Internet access to up to 600,000 user terminals.

In June 2026, India froze final approvals for Starlink to begin commercial operations, with security agencies under the Ministry of Home Affairs withholding clearance amid concerns linked to the reported use of Starlink satellite internet terminals during the ongoing Iran conflict. According to reports, the decision followed allegations that Starlink terminals were used in the Iran–Israel–United States conflict without authorization, raising security concerns in New Delhi over the control of foreign-operated satellite communication systems during wartime conditions. The suspension came despite Starlink having previously secured a Unified License and GMPCS authorization in 2025.

On May 15, 2026, the Uganda Communications Commission (UCC) signed a Memorandum of Understanding and an operational license agreement with Starlink. The service became commercially available for direct consumer subscriptions in Uganda on September 1, 2026.

=== Iran ===
In 2022, the U.S. State Department and U.S. Treasury Department updated rules regarding export of technology to Iran, allowing Starlink to be exported to Iran in support of the Iranian protests against compulsory hijab, which had triggered extensive government censorship. Immediately afterwards, Starlink service was activated in Iran. In 2023, the Iranian government filed a complaint with the ITU against SpaceX for unauthorized Starlink operation in Iran. In October 2023 and March 2024, the ITU ruled in favor of Iran, dismissing a SpaceX assertion that it should not be expected to verify the location of every terminal connecting to its satellites. Iran stated that SpaceX was capable of determining their user terminal locations by citing an October 2022 tweet from Musk saying the number of Starlink terminals operating within Iran was "approaching 100". Despite the illegality of Starlink usage in Iran, the number of Starlink users has skyrocketed via sales of the terminals on the black market. Iranian officials have acknowledged that there are 30,000 terminals in the country, providing access to some 100,000 users. In a cyber-blockade carried out in response to the protests in early 2026, Iranian authorities used military-grade jammers that largely disrupted the Starlink signal.

== Facilities ==
Starlink operates a satellite manufacturing facility in Redmond, Washington, and user-terminal manufacturing facility in Bastrop, Texas.

Starlink's satellite development and manufacturing campus occupies more than 314,000 square feet (29,200 m^{2}) across multiple buildings in Redmond, east of Seattle. The first facility opened in 2015, and the company subsequently expanded into additional buildings within the Redmond Ridge Corporate Center.

Starlink opened a user-terminal manufacturing facility in Bastrop, Texas, east of Austin, in December 2023. During its first nine months of operation, the one-million-square-foot (93,000 m^{2}) facility produced one million user terminals. According to company statements cited by PCMag, the facility was projected to become the largest printed circuit board manufacturing site in the United States.

== Technology ==
=== Satellite hardware ===
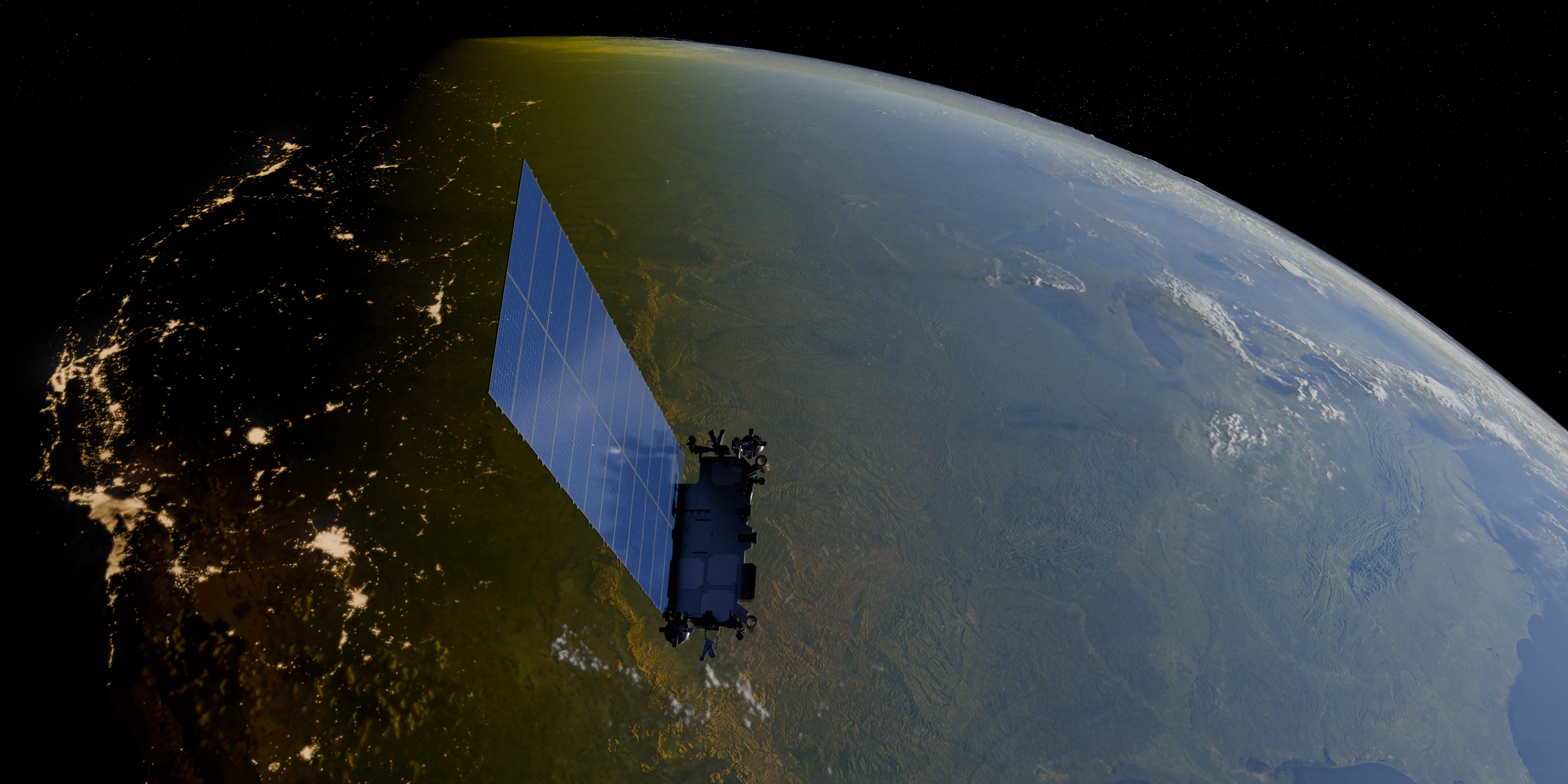
3D rendering of a Starlink satellite

The internet communication satellites were expected to be smallsats, 100 to 500 kg (220 to 1,100 lb) in mass, and were intended to be in low Earth orbit (LEO) at an altitude of approximately 1,100 km (680 mi), according to early public releases of information in 2015. The first significant deployment of 60 satellites was in May 2019, with each satellite weighing 227 kg (500 lb). SpaceX decided to place the satellites at a relatively low 550 km (340 mi) due to concerns associated with space debris from failures or low fuel in the space environment, as well as letting them use fewer satellites than were initially needed. Initial plans forecast in January 2015 were for the constellation to be made up of approximately 4,000 cross-linked satellites; more than twice as many operational satellites as were in orbit in January 2015.

The satellites employ optical inter-satellite links and phased array beam-forming and digital processing technologies in the Ku and Ka microwave bands (super high frequency [SHF] to extremely high frequency [EHF]), according to documents filed with the U.S. FCC. While specifics of the phased array technologies have been disclosed as part of the frequency application, SpaceX enforced confidentiality regarding details of the optical inter-satellite links. Early satellites were launched without laser links. The inter-satellite laser links were successfully tested in late 2020.

The satellites are mass-produced, at a much lower cost per unit of capability than previously existing satellites. Musk said, "We're going to try and do for satellites what we've done for rockets." "In order to revolutionize space, we have to address both satellites and rockets." "Smaller satellites are crucial to lowering the cost of space-based Internet and communications".

In February 2015, SpaceX asked the FCC to consider future innovative uses of the Ka-band spectrum before the FCC commits to 5G communications regulations that would create barriers to entry, since SpaceX is a new entrant to the satellite communications market. The SpaceX non-geostationary orbit communications satellite constellation will operate in the high-frequency bands above 24 GHz, "where steerable Earth station transmit antennas would have a wider geographic impact, and significantly lower satellite altitudes magnify the impact of aggregate interference from terrestrial transmissions".

Internet traffic via a geostationary satellite has a minimum theoretical round-trip latency of at least 477 milliseconds (ms; between user and ground gateway), but in practice, current satellites have latencies of 600 ms or more. Starlink satellites are orbiting at 1/105 to 1/30 of the height of geostationary orbits, and thus offer more practical Earth-to-satellite latencies of around 25 to 35 ms, comparable to existing cable and fiber networks. The system uses a peer-to-peer protocol claimed to be "simpler than IPv6"; it also incorporates native end-to-end encryption.

Starlink satellites use Hall-effect thrusters with krypton or argon gas as the reaction mass for orbit raising and station keeping. Krypton Hall thrusters tend to exhibit significantly higher erosion of the flow channel compared to a similar electric propulsion system operated with xenon, but krypton is much more abundant and has a lower market price. SpaceX claims that its 2nd generation thruster using argon has 2.4× the thrust and 1.5× the specific impulse of the krypton fueled thruster.

Second generation V2 Mini satellites have been deployed since February 2023: these craft have two solar arrays that are each longer than the single array first generation satellites had and are reported to weigh around 800 kg. Future V2 satellites, which are slated to be delivered to orbit with Starship spacecraft, are expected to weigh around 2,000 kg and carry solar arrays measuring 20 meters in length. As of August 1, 2026, Starlink's satellite hardware fleet consists of 10,895 active units across first- and second-generation hardware types.

=== User terminals ===
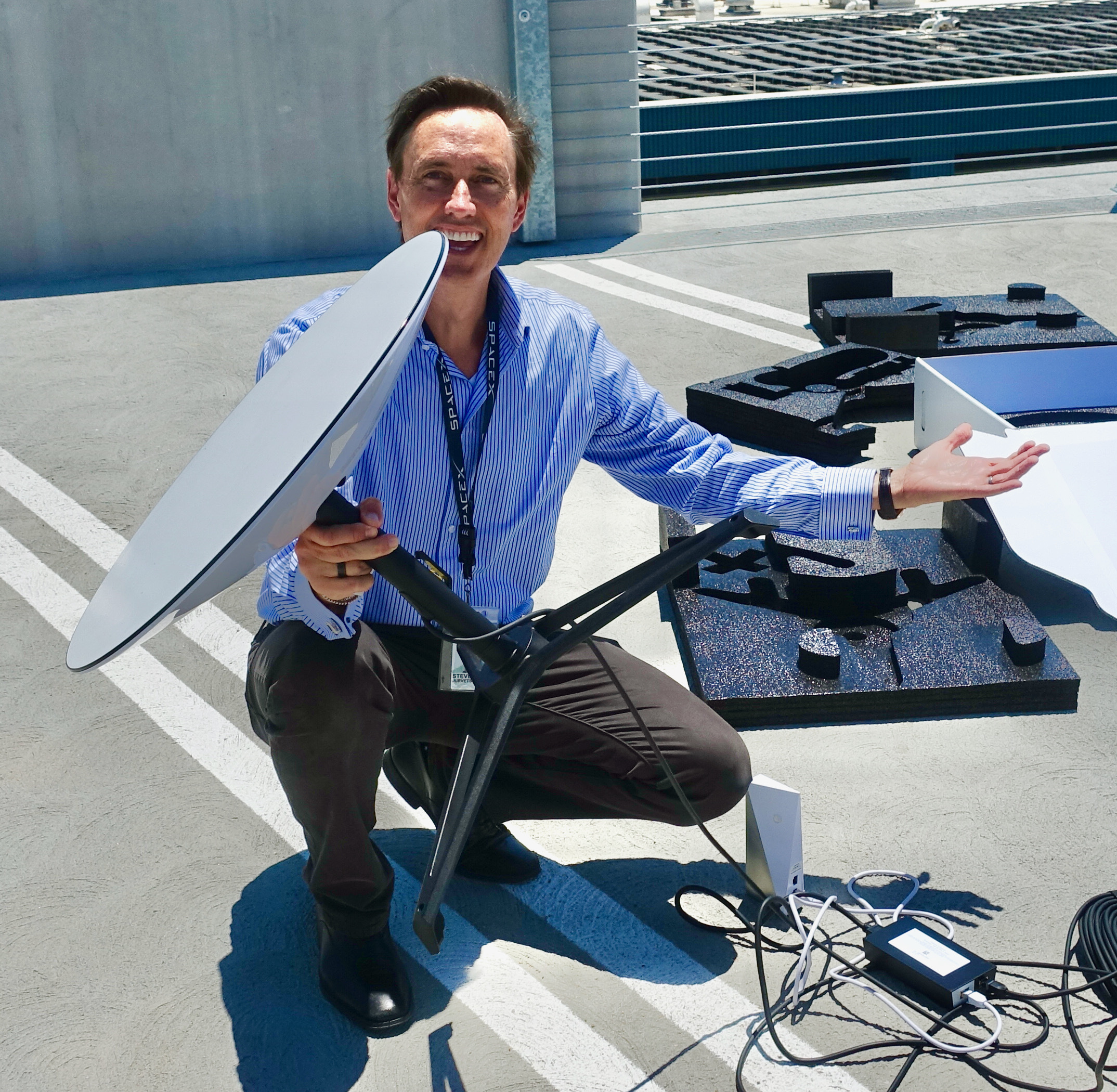
SpaceX board member Steve Jurvetson holding a Starlink user terminal in June 2020

Integrated circuit of Catson-V20, a SoC inside the user terminal

The Starlink system has multiple modes of connectivity including direct-to-cell capability as well as broadband satellite internet service. Direct-to-cell provides connectivity to unmodified cellular phones and is being offered globally in partnership with various national cellular service providers. Starlink's broadband internet service is accessed via flat user terminals the size of a pizza box, which have phased array antennas and track the satellites. The terminals can be mounted anywhere, as long as they can see the sky. This includes fast-moving objects like trains, and airplanes. Photographs of the customer antennas were first seen on the internet in June 2020, supporting earlier statements by SpaceX CEO Musk that the terminals would look like a "UFO on a stick. Starlink Terminal has motors to self-adjust optimal angle to view sky". The antenna is known internally as "Dishy McFlatface".

In October 2020, SpaceX launched a paid-for beta service in the U.S. called "Better Than Nothing Beta", charging $499 (equivalent to $610.8 in 2025) for a user terminal, with an expected service of "50 to 150 Mbit/s and latency from 20 to 40 ms over the next several months". From January 2021, the paid-for beta service was extended to other continents, starting with the United Kingdom.

A larger, high-performance version of the antenna is available for use with the Starlink Business service tier.

In September 2020, SpaceX applied for permission to put terminals on 10 of its ships with the expectation of entering the maritime market in the future.

In August 2022, and in response to an open invitation from SpaceX to have the terminal examined by the security community, security specialist Lennert Wouters presented several technical architecture details about the then-current starlink terminals: the main control unit of the dish is a STMicroelectronics custom designed SoC chip code-named Catson which is a quad-core ARM Cortex-A53-based control processor running the Linux kernel and booted using U-Boot. The main processor uses several other custom chips such as a digital beam former named Shiraz and a front-end module named Pulsarad. The main control unit controls an array of digital beamformers. Each beamformer controls 16 front-end modules. In addition the terminal has a GPS receiver, motor controllers, synchronous clock generation and power over Ethernet circuits, all manufactured by STMicroelectronics.

In June 2024, a portable user terminal dubbed "Starlink Mini" was announced to be imminently available. The Mini supports 100 Mbit/s of download speed and will fit in a backpack. Initial rollout was in Latin America at a $200 price point.

=== Ground stations ===
SpaceX has made applications to the FCC for at least 32 ground stations in the United States, and as of July 2020 has approvals for five of them (in five states). Until February 2023, Starlink used the Ka-band to connect with ground stations. With the launch of v2 Mini, frequencies were added in the 71–86 GHz W band (or E band waveguide) range.

A typical ground station has nine 2.86 metres (9.4 feet) antennas in a 400 m^{2} (4,300 ft^{2}) fenced-in area.

According to their filing, SpaceX's ground stations would also be installed on-site at Google data-centers world-wide.

=== Satellite revisions ===
==== MicroSat ====
MicroSat-1a and MicroSat-1b were originally slated to be launched into 625 km (388 mi) circular orbits at approximately 86.4° inclination, and to include panchromatic video imager cameras to film images of Earth and the satellite. The two satellites, "MicroSat-1a" and "MicroSat-1b" were meant to be launched together as secondary payloads on one of the Iridium NEXT flights, but they were instead used for ground-based tests.

==== Tintin ====
At the time of the June 2015 announcement, SpaceX had stated plans to launch the first two demonstration satellites in 2016, but the target date was subsequently moved out to 2018. SpaceX began flight testing their satellite technologies in 2018 with the launch of two test satellites. The two identical satellites were called MicroSat-2a and MicroSat-2b during development but were renamed Tintin A and Tintin B upon orbital deployment on February 22, 2018. The satellites were launched by a Falcon 9 rocket, and they were piggy-back payloads launching with the Paz satellite.

Tintin A and B were inserted into a 514 km (319 mi) orbit. Per FCC filings, they were intended to raise themselves to a 1,125 km (699 mi) orbit, the operational altitude for Starlink LEO satellites per the earliest regulatory filings, but stayed close to their original orbits. SpaceX announced in November 2018 that they would like to operate an initial shell of about 1600 satellites in the constellation at about 550 km (340 mi) orbital altitude, at an altitude similar to the orbits Tintin A and B stayed in.

The satellites orbit in a circular low Earth orbit at about 500 km (310 mi) altitude in a high-inclination orbit for a planned six to twelve-month duration. The satellites communicate with three testing ground stations in Washington State and California for short-term experiments of less than ten minutes duration, roughly daily.

==== v0.9 (test) ====
The 60 Starlink v0.9 satellites, launched in May 2019, had the following characteristics:

- Flat-panel design with multiple high-throughput antennas and a single solar array
- Mass: 227 kg (500 lb)
- Hall-effect thrusters using krypton as the reaction mass, for position adjustment on orbit, altitude maintenance, and deorbit
- Star tracker navigation system for precision pointing
- Able to use U.S. Department of Defense-provided debris data to autonomously avoid collision
- Altitude of 550 km (340 mi)
- 95% of "all components of this design will quickly burn in Earth's atmosphere at the end of each satellite's lifecycle".

==== v1.0 (operational) ====
The Starlink v1.0 satellites, initially launched in November 2019, have the following additional characteristics:

- 100% of all components of this design will completely demise, or burn up, in Earth's atmosphere at the end of each satellite's life.
- K_{a}-band added
- Mass: 260 kg (570 lb)
- One of them, numbered 1130 and called DarkSat, had its albedo reduced using a special coating but the method was abandoned due to thermal issues and IR reflectivity.
- All satellites launched since the ninth launch at August 2020 have visors to block sunlight from reflecting from parts of the satellite to reduce its albedo further.

==== v1.5 (operational) ====
The Starlink v1.5 satellites, initially launched January 24, 2021, have the following additional characteristics:

- Lasers for inter-satellite communication
- Mass: ~295 kg (650 lb)
- Visors that blocked sunlight were removed from satellites launched from September 2021 onwards.

==== Starshield (operational) ====
These are satellite buses with two solar arrays derived from Starlink v1.5 and v2.0 for military use and can host classified government or military payloads.

==== v2 (operational) ====
SpaceX was preparing for the production of Starlink v2 satellites by early 2021. According to Musk, Starlink v2 satellites will be "...an order of magnitude better than Starlink 1" in terms of communications bandwidth.

SpaceX hoped to begin launching Starlink v2 in 2022. As of May 2022, SpaceX had said publicly that the satellites of second-generation (Gen2) constellation would need to be launched on Starship, as they are too large to fit inside a Falcon 9 fairing. However, in August 2022, SpaceX made formal regulatory filings with the FCC that indicated they would build satellites of the second-generation (Gen2) constellation in two different, but technically identical, form factors: one with the physical structures tailored to launching on Falcon 9, and one tailored for the launching on Starship. Starlink v2 is both larger and heavier than Starlink v1 satellites.

Starlink second-generation satellites for launch on Starship were planned, as of 2022, to have the following characteristics:

- Lasers for inter-satellite communication
- Mass: ~1,250 kg (2,760 lb)
- Length: ~7 m (23 ft)
- Further improvements to reduce its brightness, including the use of a dielectric mirror film.
- On 2,016 of the initially licensed 7,500 satellites: Gen2 Starlink satellites will also include an approximately 25 square meter antenna that would allow T-Mobile subscribers to be able to communicate directly via satellite through their regular mobile devices. hosted payload developed together with SpaceX's subsidiary Swarm Technologies and T-Mobile. This hardware is supplemental to the existing K_{u}-band and K_{a}-band systems, and inter-satellite laser links, that have been on the first generation satellites launching as of mid-2022.

In October 2022, SpaceX revealed the configuration of early v2s to be launched on Falcon 9. In May 2023, SpaceX introduced two more form factors with direct-to-cellular (DtC) capability.

To allow connectivity for third party satellites and space stations with the Starlink constellation.

The bus design for Starlink satellites has varied considerably since the first units were deployed in space in 2019:

- Bus F9-1, 303 kg (668 lb) mass, having roughly the same dimensions and mass as V1.5 satellites. Deployed in Group 5 (see constellation design section).
- Bus F9-2 (typically called "v2 mini"), up to 800 kg (1,800 lb) mass and measuring 4.1 m (13 ft) by 2.7 m (8 ft 10 in) with a total array of 120 m^{2} (1,300 sq ft). The Solar arrays are 2 in number. It could offer around 3–4 times more usable bandwidth per satellite. They are smaller than Starlink's original ones (and so can be launched on Falcon 9) and have four times the capacity to the ground station to increase speed and capacity. This is due to a more efficient array of antennas and the use of radio frequencies in the W band (E band waveguide) range. They were deployed in Groups 6 and 7 (see constellation design section).
- Bus F9-3, F9-2 with direct-to-cellular capability. The bus length was increased to 7.4 m (24 ft). Mass increased to 970 kg (2,140 lb).
- Bus Starship-2 (planned), Starship-1 with direct-to-cellular capability. The bus length increased to 10.1 m (33 ft).

The first six F9-3 satellites with direct-to-cellular (DtC) capability were launched on January 2, 2024, in Groups 7–9.

Name	Component	Length (m)	Width (m)	Number	Area (m^{2})	Debris Assessment Software (DAS) area (m^{2})	DAS mass (kg)
F9-1 (v1.5)	Solar Array	8.1	2.8	1	22.68		
F9-1 (v1.5)	Bus	2.8	1.3	1	3.64		
F9-1 (v1.5)	Total				26.32	30	303
F9-2 (v2 mini)	Solar Array	12.8	4.1	2	104.96		
F9-2 (v2 mini)	Bus	4.1	2.7	1	11.07		
F9-2 (v2 mini)	Total				116.03	120	800
F9-3 (v2 mini with DtC)	Solar Array	12.8	4.1	2	105		
F9-3 (v2 mini with DtC)	Bus	7.4	2.7	1	20		
F9-3 (v2 mini with DtC)	Total				125	130	970
Starship-1 (v2)	Solar Array	20.2	6.36	2	256.94		
Starship-1 (v2)	Bus	6.4	2.7	1	17.28		
Starship-1 (v2)	Total				274.22	294	2000
Starship-2 (v2 with DtC)	Solar Array	20.2	6.36	2	256.94		
Starship-2 (v2 with DtC)	Bus	10.1	2.7	1	27.27		
Starship-2 (v2 with DtC)	Total				284.21	294	2000

==== v3 (initial deployment) ====
Starlink v3 satellites are a further enlargement of the design and began operation in 2026. Designed to be launched on Starship, they are too large to be launched on Falcon 9. They have a mass of approximately 2,000 kg (4,400 lb), about twice that of the previous v2 version.

Each v3 satellite has 1 Tbit/s of downlink and 160 Gbit/s of uplink capacity, which is approximately 10 times the downlink capacity and 22 times the uplink capacity of a v2 satellite. The satellite's phased-array antennas support 2,048 downlink beams and 2,048 uplink beams, compared with 192 downlink and 144 uplink beams on v2. SpaceX states that a fully-loaded Starship launch of v3 satellites will add approximately 20 times the capacity of a Falcon 9 launch of v2 satellites. Starship can carry a maximum of about 60 v3 satellites.

On September 28, 2026, the 14th flight of Starship deployed 26 v3 satellites into low Earth orbit. It was the first orbital flight of Starship and its first deployment of an operational payload.

== Launches ==
Between February 2018 and May 2024, SpaceX successfully launched over 6,000 Starlink satellites into orbit, including prototypes and satellites that later failed or were de-orbited before entering operational service. In March 2020, SpaceX reported producing six satellites per day.

The deployment of the first 1,440 satellites was planned in 72 orbital planes of 20 satellites each, with a requested lower minimum elevation angle of beams to improve reception: 25° rather than the 40° of the other two orbital shells. SpaceX launched the first 60 satellites of the constellation in May 2019 into a 550 km (340 mi) orbit and expected up to six launches in 2019 at that time, with 720 satellites (12 × 60) for continuous coverage in 2020.

Starlink v3 satellites are launched on Starship, a SpaceX rocket with a much larger payload capability. The initial announcement in 2019 included plans to launch up to 400 Starlink (version 1.0) satellites at a time. After a suborbital deployment trial on Starship flight 13 in July 2026, the first batch of 26 operational v3 satellites were deployed into orbit on Starship flight 14 in September 2026.

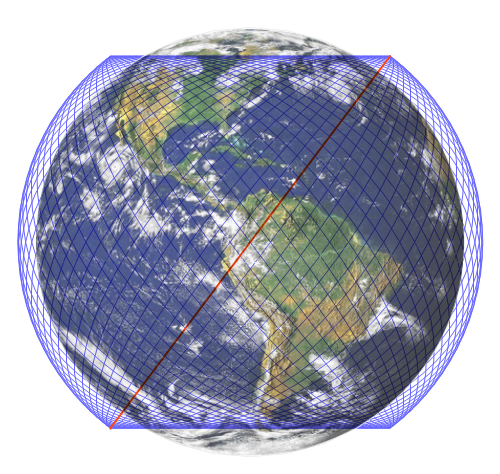
The Starlink constellation, phase 1, first orbital shell: 72 orbits with 22 each, therefore 1584 satellites at 550 km (340 mi) altitude

=== Constellation design and status ===
In March 2017, SpaceX filed plans with the FCC to field a second orbital shell of more than 7,500 "V-band satellites in non-geosynchronous orbits to provide communications services" in an electromagnetic spectrum that has not previously been heavily employed for commercial communications services. Called the "Very-low Earth orbit (VLEO) constellation", it was to have comprised 7,518 satellites that were to orbit at just 340 km (210 mi) altitude, while the smaller, originally planned group of 4,425 satellites would operate in the K_{a}- and K_{u}-bands and orbit at 1,200 km (750 mi) altitude. By 2022, SpaceX had withdrawn plans to field the 7,518-satellite V-band system, superseding it with a more comprehensive design for a second-generation (Gen2) Starlink network.

In November 2018, SpaceX received U.S. regulatory approval to deploy 7,518 V-band broadband satellites, in addition to the 4,425 approved earlier; however, the V-band plans were subsequently withdrawn by 2022. At the same time, SpaceX also made new regulatory filings with the U.S. FCC to request the ability to alter its previously granted license in order to operate approximately 1,600 of the 4,425 Ka-/Ku-band satellites approved for operation at 1,150 km (710 mi) in a "new lower shell of the constellation" at only 550 km (340 mi) orbital altitude. These satellites would effectively operate in a third orbital shell, a 550 km (340 mi) orbit, while the higher and lower orbits at approximately 1,200 km (750 mi) and approximately 340 km (210 mi) would be used only later, once a considerably larger deployment of satellites becomes possible in the later years of the deployment process. The FCC approved the request in April 2019, giving approval to place nearly 12,000 satellites in three orbital shells: initially approximately 1,600 in a 550 km (340 mi) – altitude shell, and subsequently placing approximately 2,800 Ku- and Ka-band spectrum satellites at 1,150 km (710 mi) and approximately 7,500 V-band satellites at 340 km (210 mi). In total, nearly 12,000 satellites were planned to be deployed, with (as of 2019) a possible later extension to 42,000.

In February 2019, a sister company of SpaceX, SpaceX Services Incorporated, filed a request with the FCC to receive a license for the operation of up to a million fixed satellite Earth stations that would communicate with its non-geostationary orbit (NGSO) satellite Starlink system.

In June 2019, SpaceX applied to the FCC for a license to test up to 270 ground terminals – 70 nationwide across the United States and 200 in Washington state at SpaceX employee homes – and aircraft-borne antenna operation from four distributed United States airfields; as well as five ground-to-ground test locations.

On October 15, 2019, the United States FCC submitted filings to the International Telecommunication Union (ITU) on SpaceX's behalf to arrange spectrum for 30,000 additional Starlink satellites to supplement the 12,000 Starlink satellites already approved by the FCC. That month, Musk publicly tested the Starlink network by using an Internet connection routed through the network to post a first tweet to social media site Twitter.

In January 2026 SpaceX announced plans to lower approximately 4,400 satellites from their current 550 km orbit to 480 km over the course of the year, citing improved space safety and reduced orbital decay time for decommissioned satellites.

==== First generation ====
The chart below contains all v0.9 and first generation satellites (Tintin A and Tintin B, as test satellites, are not included).

Group designation	Orbital shells		Orbital planes			Committed completion date		Deployed satellites July 12, 2025		
Group designation	Altitude (km)	Authorized satellites	Inclination	Count	Satellites per	Half	Full	Total active	Decaying/ deorbited	To be disposed of/out of constellation
Group 1	550 km (340 mi)	1,584	53.05°	72	22	March 2024 (goal); August 1, 2022 (achieved)	March 2027	919	746	167
Group 2	570 km (350 mi)	720	70°	36	20	March 2024 (goal); August 1, 2022 (achieved)	March 2027	368	40	17
Group 3	560 km (350 mi)	348	97.6°	6	58	March 2024 (goal); August 1, 2022 (achieved)	March 2027	221	22	11
Group 4	540 km (340 mi)	1,584	53.22°	72	22	March 2024 (goal); August 1, 2022 (achieved)	March 2027	1,459	178	32
	560 km (350 mi)	172	97.6°	4	43	March 2024 (goal); August 1, 2022 (achieved)	March 2027	0	0	0

Early designs had all phase 1 satellites in altitudes of around 1,100–1,300 km (680–810 mi). SpaceX initially requested to lower the first 1584 satellites, and in April 2020 requested to lower all other higher satellite orbits to about 550 km (340 mi). In April 2020, SpaceX modified the architecture of the Starlink network. SpaceX submitted an application to the FCC proposing to operate more satellites in lower orbits in the first phase than the FCC previously authorized. The first phase will still include 1,440 satellites in the first shell orbiting at 550 km (340 mi) in planes inclined 53.0°, with no change to the first shell of the constellation launched largely in 2020. SpaceX also applied in the United States for use of the E-band in their constellation The FCC approved the application in April 2021.

On January 24, 2021 SpaceX released a new group of 10 Starlink satellites, the first Starlink satellites in polar / SSO orbits. The launch surpassed ISRO's record of launching the most satellites in one mission (143), taking to 1,025 the cumulative number of satellites deployed for Starlink to that date.

On February 3, 2022, 49 satellites were launched as Starlink Group 4–7. A G2-rated geomagnetic storm occurred on February 4, caused the atmosphere to warm and density at the low deployment altitudes to increase. Predictions were that up to 40 of the 49 satellites might be lost due to drag. After the event, 38 satellites reentered the atmosphere by February 12 while the remaining 11 were able to raise their orbits and avoid loss due to the storm.

In March 2023, SpaceX submitted an application to add V-band payload to the second generation satellites rather than fly phase 2 V-band satellites as originally planned and authorized. The request is subject to FCC approval.

==== Second generation ====
===== Falcon 9 =====
Group designation	Orbital shells			Orbital planes (Note: SpaceX abandoned configuration 2 proposed in the amendment)			Committed completion date		Deployed satellites May 16, 2025		
Group designation	Nominal altitude (Note: The satellites can be deployed -50 km (30 miles) and +70 km (40 miles) (max 580 km; 360 miles) relative to the nominal altitude)	Actual altitude	Planned satellites	Inclination	Count	Satellites per	Half	Full	Active	Decaying/ deorbited	Satellites needed for completion
Group 5	530 km (330 mi)	559 km (347 mi)	2,500 (Note: The FCC limited phase 1 to 7,500 satellites across 3 shells.)	43°	28	120	December 1, 2028	December 1, 2031	671	28	33
Group 6	530 km (330 mi)	488, 559 km (303, 347 mi)	2,500	43°	28	120	December 1, 2028	December 1, 2031	1,779	75	33
Group 7	525 km (326 mi)	482, 510, 549 km (300, 317, 341 mi)	2,500	53°	28	120	December 1, 2028	December 1, 2031	377	12	2,123
Group 8	535 km (332 mi)	535 km (332 mi)	2,500	53°	28	120	December 1, 2028	December 1, 2031	220	5	2,280
Group 9	535 km (332 mi)			53°					276	27	
Group 10	480 km (300 mi)			53°					271	1	
Group 11	535 km (332 mi)			53°					269	1	
Group 12	559 km (347 mi)			43°					454	1	
Group 13	559 km (347 mi)			43°					21		
Group 15	535 km (332 mi)			70°					100		

Starlink February 12, 2023, launch plus 19 hours

Due to delays with Starship development, SpaceX modified the v2 Starlink satellites into a less capable but more compact form factor named "v2 mini", thus enabling these satellites to be launched on Falcon 9. The first set of 21 of these satellites was launched on February 27, 2023. SpaceX committed to reducing debris by keeping the Starlink tension rods, which hold the v2 mini-satellites together during launch, attached to the Falcon 9 second stage. These tension rods were discarded into orbit while launching earlier versions of Starlink satellites. Observations confirm that v2 mini satellites host two solar panels, like the larger v2 satellites.

==== Third generation ====
===== Starship =====
Group designation	Orbital shells			Orbital planes (Note: SpaceX abandoned configuration 2 proposed in the amendment)			Committed completion date		Deployed satellites May 16, 2025		
Group designation	Nominal altitude (Note: The satellites can be deployed -50 km (30 miles) and +70 km (40 miles) (max 580 km; 360 miles) relative to the nominal altitude)	Actual altitude	Planned satellites	Inclination	Count	Satellites per	Half	Full	Active	Decaying/ deorbited	Satellites needed for completion
Simulators	146 km (91 mi) (transatmospheric)	146 km (91 mi) (transatmospheric)	30	26.4°	—	—	—	—	0	30	—
GS-0	146 km (91 mi) (transatmospheric)	146 km (91 mi) (transatmospheric)	20	26.4°	—	—	—	—	0	20	—
Group 31	559 km (347 mi)			43°					26	0	

Starship began carrying Starlink payloads in test flights with Flight 7 in January 2025. Each of these flights carried up to ten Starlink "simulators" (mass simulators of the satellites) for deployment on a suborbital trajectory, so that they would reenter over the Indian Ocean. Flight 7 failed to reach this objective, as did Flights 8 and 9. Successful tests occurred on Flight 10 and Flight 11, with 8 of 8 Starlink simulators deployed each time.

Flight 12, on May 22, 2026, was the first flight of the Block 3 Starship and flew a suborbital trajectory. It deployed 22 payloads: 20 Starlink v3 mass simulators and two modified v2 mini satellites equipped with cameras. On Flight 13, on July 24, 2026, Starship carried 20 production v3 satellites on a suborbital trajectory. It was the first Starship flight to deploy operational Starlink satellites rather than simulators.

On September 28, 2026, Flight 14 became the first Starship flight to reach orbit, and deployed 26 v3 satellites as Starlink Group 31–1. One Raptor Vacuum engine shut down early during ascent, and Starship compensated by burning its remaining engines for longer. SpaceX said it made contact with all 26 satellites over laser links, ground stations, and user terminals, and that they would perform on-orbit checkouts and raise their orbits before entering service.

=== Incidents ===
After the successful launch of Starlink 11-4 the second stage spun out of control and reentered earth's atmosphere over eastern Europe with a fireball visible from Berlin and Sweden as several chunks of space debris crashed into Poland near the city of Poznań. No one was hurt in the incident. Several smaller chunks were reported in the village of Wiry, and it is possible some landed in Ukraine, although officials there did not investigate. The main impact of the incident was that the Polish Space Agency (POLSA) accidentally sent its report on the incoming space debris to the wrong email address at the Polish Ministry of Defense, leaving the rest of the government in the dark on its potential hazard and in turn POLSA's president, Grzegorz Wrochna would be dismissed from his post.

== Impact on astronomy ==
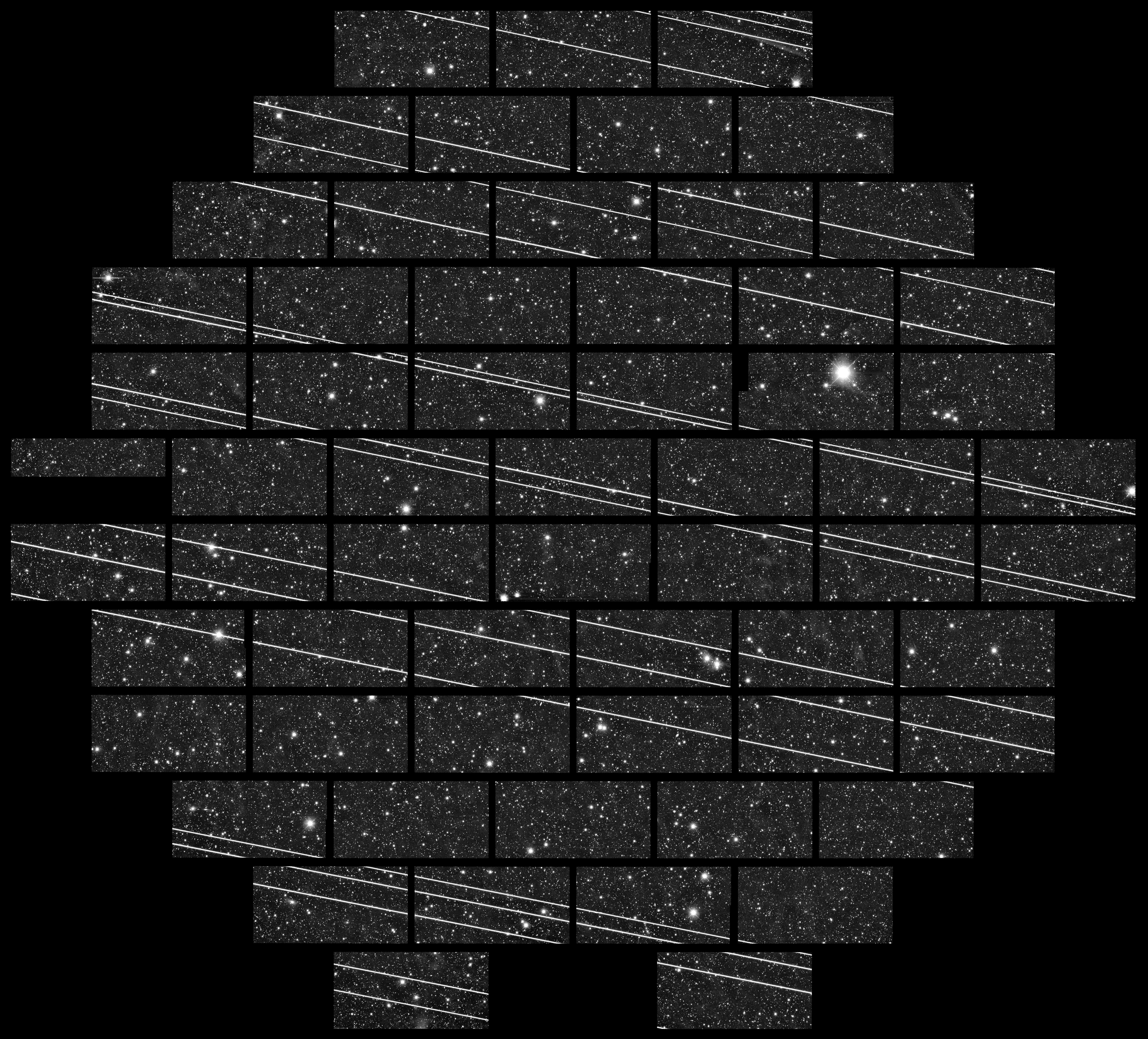
Signal pollution in a 333-second exposure image taken from the Blanco four-meter (13') telescope at the Cerro Tololo Inter-American Observatory in November 2019

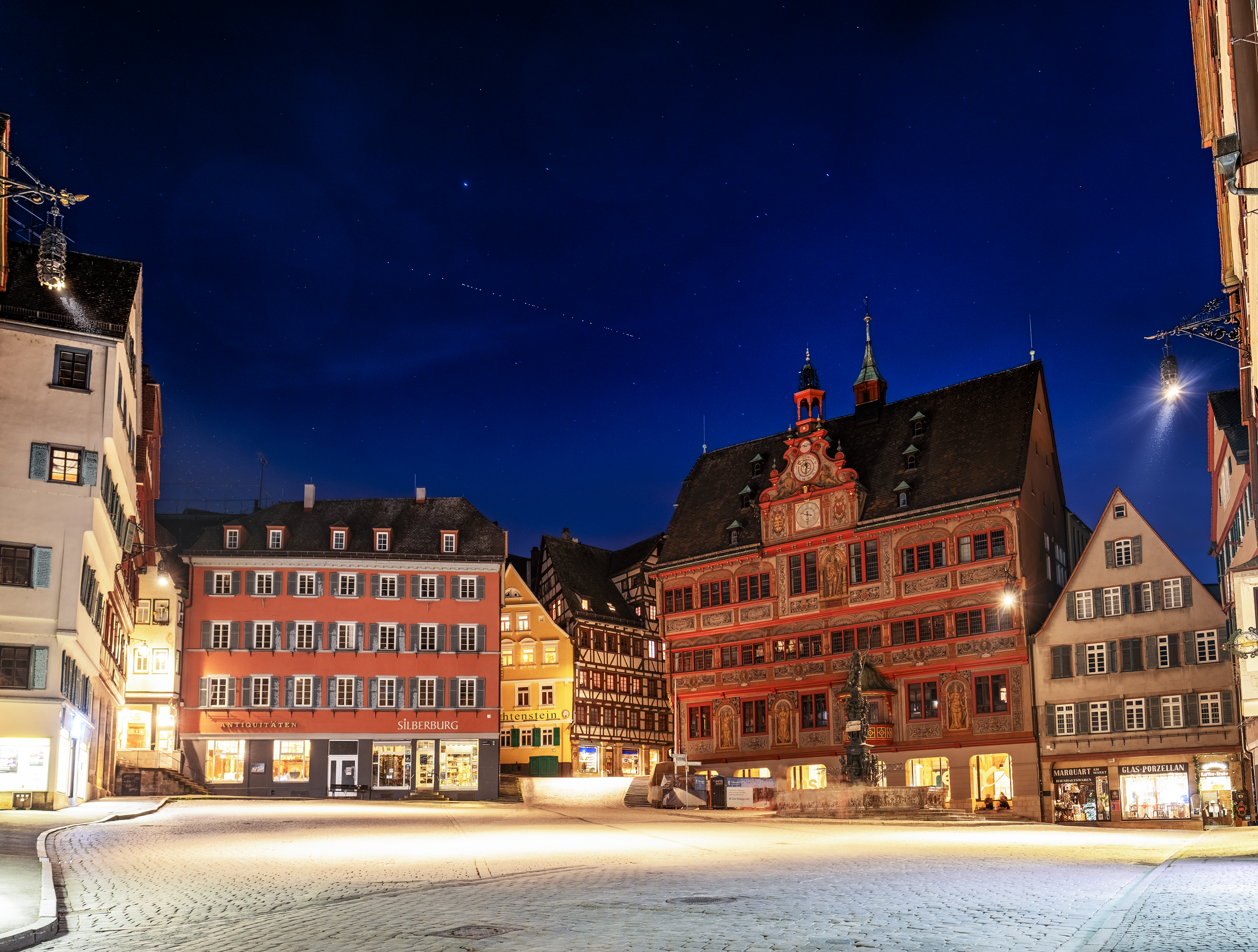
Starlink over Tübingen, Germany

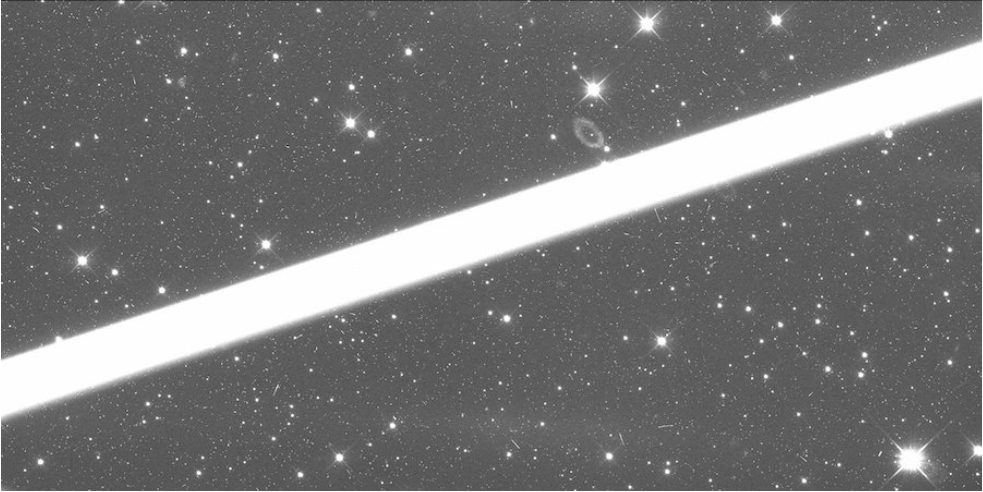
Starlink 1619 seen by the Hubble Space Telescope

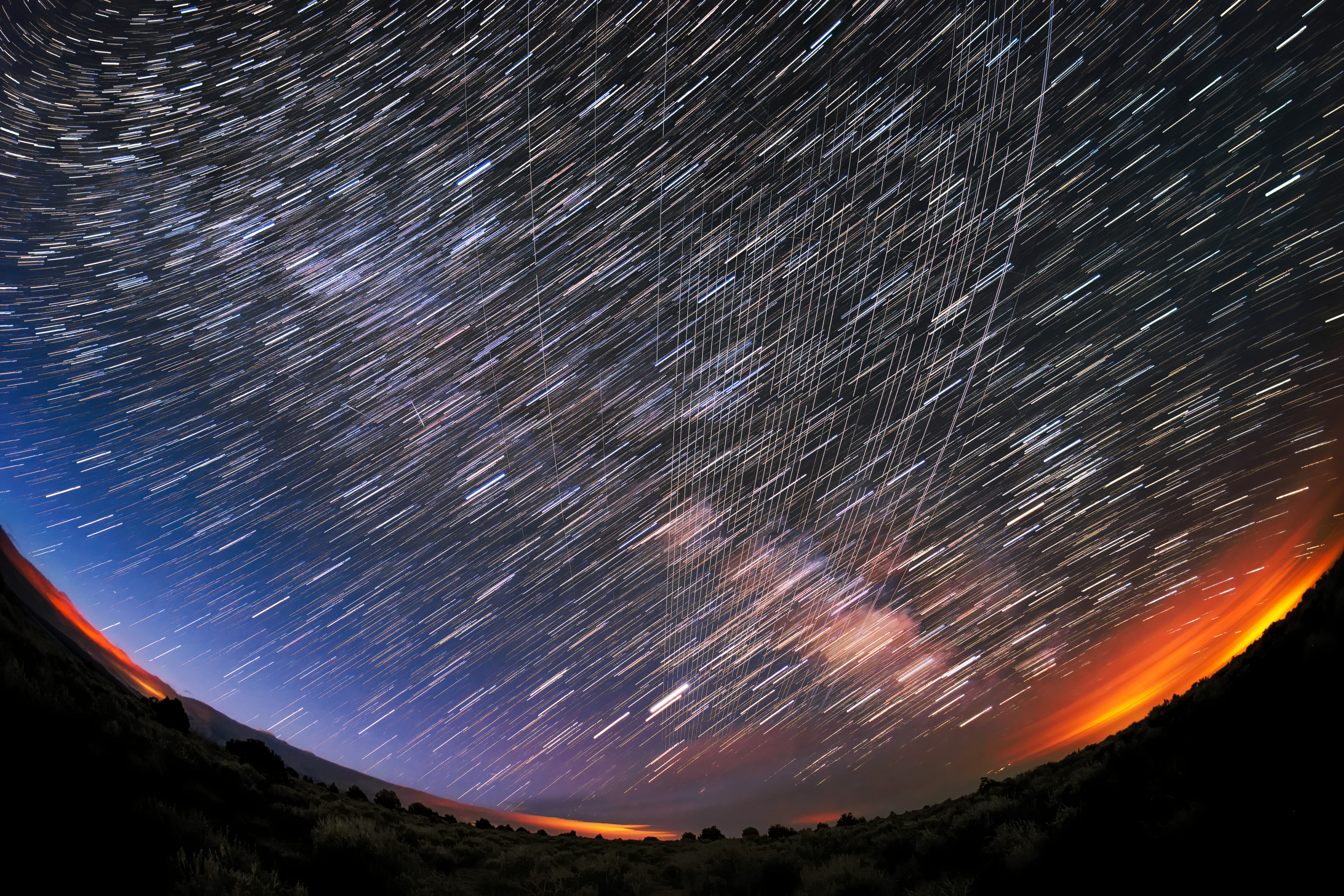
Timelapse of recently deployed satellites (vertical lines)

The planned large number of satellites has been met with criticism from the astronomical community because of concerns over light pollution. Astronomers claim that their brightness in both optical and radio wavelengths will severely impact scientific observations. While astronomers can schedule observations to avoid pointing where satellites currently orbit, it is "getting more difficult" as more satellites come online. The International Astronomical Union (IAU), the National Radio Astronomy Observatory (NRAO), and the Square Kilometre Array Organization (SKAO) have released official statements expressing concern on the matter. Recent studies have proved that the "unintended electromagnetic radiation" affects radio telescopes and creates distortions and excessive noise. The IAU Centre for the Protection of the Dark and Quiet Sky from Satellite Constellation Interference was created to manage these new man-made obstacles to space exploration.

=== Visible optical interference ===
On November 20, 2019, the four-meter (13') Blanco telescope of the Cerro Tololo Inter-American Observatory (CTIO) recorded strong signal loss and the appearance of 19 white lines on a DECam shot (right image). This image noise was correlated to the transit of a Starlink satellite train, launched a week earlier.

SpaceX representatives and Musk have claimed that the satellites will have minimal impact, being easily mitigated by pixel masking and image stacking. However, professional astronomers have disputed these claims based on initial observation of the Starlink v0.9 satellites on the first launch, shortly after their deployment from the launch vehicle. In later statements on Twitter, Musk stated that SpaceX will work on reducing the albedo of the satellites and will provide on-demand orientation adjustments for astronomical experiments, if necessary. One Starlink satellite (Starlink 1130 / DarkSat) launched with an experimental coating to reduce its albedo. The reduction in g-band magnitude is 0.8 magnitude (55%). Despite these measures, astronomers found that the satellites were still too bright, thus making DarkSat essentially a "dead end".

On April 17, 2020, SpaceX wrote in an FCC filing that it would test new methods of mitigating light pollution, and also provide access to satellite tracking data for astronomers to "better coordinate their observations with our satellites". On April 27, 2020, Musk announced that the company would introduce a new sunshade designed to reduce the brightness of Starlink satellites. As of 15 October 2020, over 200 Starlink satellites had a sunshade. An October 2020 analysis found them to be only marginally fainter than DarkSat. A January 2021 study pinned the brightness at 31% of the original design.

According to a May 2021 study, "A large number of fast-moving transmitting stations (i.e. satellites) will cause further interference. New analysis methods could mitigate some of these effects, but data loss is inevitable, increasing the time needed for each study and limiting the overall amount of science done".

In February 2022, the International Astronomical Union (IAU) established a center to help astronomers deal with the adverse effects of satellite constellations such as Starlink. Work will include the development of software tools for astronomers, advancement of national and international policies, community outreach and work with industry on relevant technologies.

In June 2022, the IAU released a website for astronomers to deal with some adverse effects via satellite tracking. This will enable astronomers to be able to track satellites to be able to avoid and time them for minimal impact on current work.

The first batch of Generation 2 spacecraft was launched in February 2023. These satellites are referred to as "Mini" because they are smaller than the full-sized Gen 2 spacecraft that will come later. SpaceX uses brightness mitigation for Gen 2 that includes a mirror-like surface which reflects sunlight back into space and they orient the solar panels so that observers on the ground only see the dark sides. The Minis are fainter than Gen 1 spacecraft despite being four times as large according to an observational study published in June 2023. They are 44% as bright as VisorSats, 24% compared to V1.5 and 19% compared to the original design which had no brightness mitigation. Minis appear 12 times brighter before they reach the target orbit.

=== Radio interference ===
In October 2023, research published in "Astronomy and Astrophysics Letters" had reportedly found that Starlink satellites were "leaking radio signals" finding that at the site of the future Square Kilometer Array, radio emissions from Starlink satellites were brighter than any natural source in the sky. The paper concluded that these emissions will be "detrimental to key SKA science goals without future mitigation".

== Increased risk of satellite collision ==
The large number of satellites employed by Starlink may create the long-term danger of space debris resulting from placing thousands of satellites in orbit and the risk of causing a satellite collision, potentially triggering a cascade phenomenon known as Kessler syndrome SpaceX has said that most of the satellites are launched at a lower altitude, and failed satellites are expected to deorbit within five years without propulsion. in near-Earth orbit.

According to SpaceX's semiannual reports filed with the Federal Communications Commission, Starlink satellites performed approximately 50,000 collision-avoidance maneuvers between December 1, 2023, and May 31, 2024, about double the number from the previous six-month period. This represented an average of 14 maneuvers per satellite during the six-month period.

Early in the program, a near-miss occurred when SpaceX did not move a satellite that had a 1 in 1,000 chance of colliding with a European one, ten times higher than the ESA's threshold for avoidance maneuvers. SpaceX subsequently fixed an issue with its paging system that had disrupted emails between the ESA and SpaceX. The ESA said it plans to invest in technologies to automate satellite collision avoidance maneuvers.

In 2021, Chinese authorities lodged a complaint with the United Nations, saying their space station had performed evasive maneuvers that year to avoid Starlink satellites. In the document, Chinese delegates said that the continuously maneuvering Starlink satellites posed a risk of collision, and two close encounters with the satellites in July and October constituted dangers to the life or health of astronauts aboard the Chinese Tiangong space station.

The destruction of the Russian satellite Kosmos 1408 in November 2021 by an anti-satellite weapon test impacted Starlink operations. According to SpaceX reports, over 1,700 out of 6,873 collision avoidance maneuvers performed by Starlink satellites between December 1, 2021, and May 31, 2022, were to avoid Kosmos 1408 debris.

All these reported issues, plus current plans for the extension of the constellation, motivated a formal letter from the National Telecommunications and Information Administration (NTIA) on behalf of NASA and the US NSF, submitted to the US FCC on February 8, 2022, warning about the potential impact on low Earth orbit, increased collision risk, impact on science missions, rocket launches, International Space Station and radio frequencies.

SpaceX satellites will maneuver if the probability of collision is greater than 10^{−6} (1 in 1,000,000 chance of collision), compared to the industry standard of 10^{−4} (1 in 10,000 chance of collision). SpaceX has budgeted sufficient propellant to accommodate approximately 5,000 propulsive maneuvers over the life of a Gen2 satellite, including a budget of approximately 350 collision avoidance maneuvers per satellite over that time period. As of May 2022, the average Starlink satellite had conducted fewer than three collision-avoidance maneuvers over the 6 preceding months.

== Competition and market effects ==
In addition to the OneWeb constellation, announced nearly concurrently with the SpaceX constellation, a 2015 proposal from Samsung outlined a 4,600-satellite constellation orbiting at 1,400 km (870 mi) that could provide a zettabyte per month capacity worldwide, an equivalent of 200 gigabytes per month for 5 billion users of Internet data, but by 2020, no more public information had been released about the Samsung constellation. Telesat announced a smaller 117 satellite constellation in 2015 with plans to deliver initial service in 2021. Amazon announced a large broadband internet satellite constellation in April 2019, planning to launch 3,236 satellites in the next decade in what the company calls "Project Kuiper", a satellite constellation that will work in concert with Amazon's previously announced large network of twelve satellite ground station facilities (the "AWS ground station unit") announced in November 2018.

In February 2015, financial analysts questioned established geosynchronous orbit communications satellite fleet operators as to how they intended to respond to the competitive threat of SpaceX and OneWeb LEO communication satellites. In October 2015, SpaceX President Gwynne Shotwell indicated that while development continues, the business case for the long-term rollout of an operational satellite network was still in an early phase.

By October 2017, the expectation for large increases in satellite network capacity from emerging lower-altitude broadband constellations caused market players to cancel some planned investments in new geosynchronous orbit broadband communications satellites.

SpaceX was challenged regarding Starlink in February 2021 when the National Rural Electric Cooperative Association (NRECA), a political interest group representing traditional rural internet service providers, urged the U.S. Federal Communications Commission (FCC) to "actively, and aggressively, and thoughtfully vet" the subsidy applications of SpaceX and other broadband providers. At the time, SpaceX had provisionally won $886 million for a commitment to provide service to approximately 643,000 locations in 35 states as part of the Rural Digital Opportunity Fund (RDOF). The NRECA criticisms included that the funding allocation to Starlink would include service to locations—such as Harlem and terminals at Newark Liberty International Airport and Miami International Airport—that are not rural, and because SpaceX was planning to build the infrastructure and serve any customers who request service with or without the FCC subsidy. Additionally, Jim Matheson, chief executive officer of the NRECA voiced concern about technologies that had not yet been proven to meet the high speeds required for the award category. Starlink was specifically criticized for being still in beta testing and for unproven technology.

While Starlink is deployed worldwide, it has encountered trademark conflicts in some countries such as Mexico and Ukraine.

=== Similar or competitive systems ===
- Amazon Leo – a planned 3,276 LEO satellite Internet constellation by an Amazon subsidiary.
- AST SpaceMobile – a satellite-to-mobile-phone satellite constellation working with large mobile network operators such as Vodafone, AT&T, Orange, Rakuten, Telestra, Telefónica, etc. with the objective to provide broadband internet coverage to existing unmodified mobile phones.
- Globalstar – an operational low Earth orbit (LEO) satellite constellation for satellite phone and low-speed data communications, covering most of the world's landmass.
- Guowang – a Chinese low-Earth orbit satellite internet mega constellation, being launched.
- Hughes Network Systems – a broadband satellite provider providing fixed, cellular backhaul, and airborne antennas.
- Iridium – an operational constellation of 66 cross-linked satellites in a polar orbit, used to provide satellite phone and low-speed data services over the entire surface of Earth.
- Inmarsat – a satellite based nautical distress network for transmitting telex, fax, and other text messages since 1979 – typically used in nautical scenarios and disaster scenarios.
- Lynk Global – a satellite-to-mobile-phone satellite constellation with the objective to coverage to traditional low-cost mobile devices.
- O3b and O3b mPOWER – medium Earth orbit constellations that provide maritime, aviation and military connectivity, and cellular backhaul; coverage between latitudes 50°N and 50°S.
- OneWeb satellite constellation – a satellite constellation project that began operational deployment of satellites in 2020.
- Orbcomm – an operational constellation used to provide global asset monitoring and messaging services from its constellation of 29 LEO communications satellites orbiting at 775 km (482 mi).
- Qianfan – a Chinese low-Earth orbit satellite internet megaconstellation, being launched.
- Teledesic – a former (1990s) venture to accomplish broadband satellite internet services
- Viasat, Inc. – a broadband satellite provider providing fixed, ground mobile, and airborne antennas.

== See also ==
- Project Loon – Former concept to provide Internet access via balloons in the stratosphere
- Satellite flare
