= E band (waveguide) =

Radio frequency from 60 to 90 GHz

Waveguide E band
- Frequency range: 60 – 90 GHz
- Wavelength range: 5 – 3.33 mm
- Related bands: V / W (IEEE); EHF (ITU)

The waveguide E band is the range of radio frequencies from 60 GHz to 90 GHz in the electromagnetic spectrum, corresponding to the recommended frequency band of operation of WR12 waveguides. These frequencies are equivalent to wave lengths between 5 mm and 3.333 mm. The E band is in the EHF range of the radio spectrum.

== Atmospheric effects ==
At these high frequencies, the short wavelengths give the radiation a very directional quality, similar to visible light. Many molecules possess rotational and vibrational states excited by very specific wavelengths in this band, thus the atmospheric gases such as oxygen, water vapor, carbon dioxide and nitrogen can absorb, and be excited causing variable beam attenuation effects dependent on meteorological and atmospheric conditions.

== Applications ==
In October 2003, the Federal Communications Commission (FCC) ruled that spectrum at 71 to 76 GHz, 81 to 86 GHz and 92 to 95 GHz was available for high-density fixed wireless services in the United States.

The Radio Regulations of the International Telecommunication Union allow amateur radio and amateur satellite operations in the frequency range 76.000 GHz to 81.000 GHz, which is known as the 4-millimeter band.

In June 2020, SpaceX applied for use of the E-Band in the Starlink Gen2 constellation. Generation 2 Starlink Gen2 satellites will include 71 - 79 GHz and 81 - 86 GHz operational frequencies. This was approved by the Federal Communications Commission (FCC) on March 8th, 2024.
