= Wiry =

Wiry may refer to:

== Places ==
- Wiry, Lower Silesian Voivodeship (south-west Poland)
- Wiry, Łódź Voivodeship (central Poland)
- Wiry, Subcarpathian Voivodeship (south-east Poland)
- Wiry, Greater Poland Voivodeship (west-central Poland)
- Wiry, West Pomeranian Voivodeship (north-west Poland)
- Wiry-au-Mont, a commune in the Somme department in Hauts-de-France in northern France

== Radio stations ==
- WIRY (AM), a radio station (1340 AM) licensed to serve Plattsburgh, New York, United States
- WSLP, a radio station (100.7 FM) licensed to serve Plattsburgh West, New York, which held the call sign WIRY-FM from 2016 to 2020

== Other uses ==
- Thinness
- Wiry the fairy, a character in The Fairly OddParents
