= List of LVM3 launches =

Launch history of LVM3

This article lists all the previous and planned launches by ISRO using LVM3 (previously referred as the GSLV Mk III) rockets. As of December 2025, there have been 9 launches of LVM3, with all of them being successful.

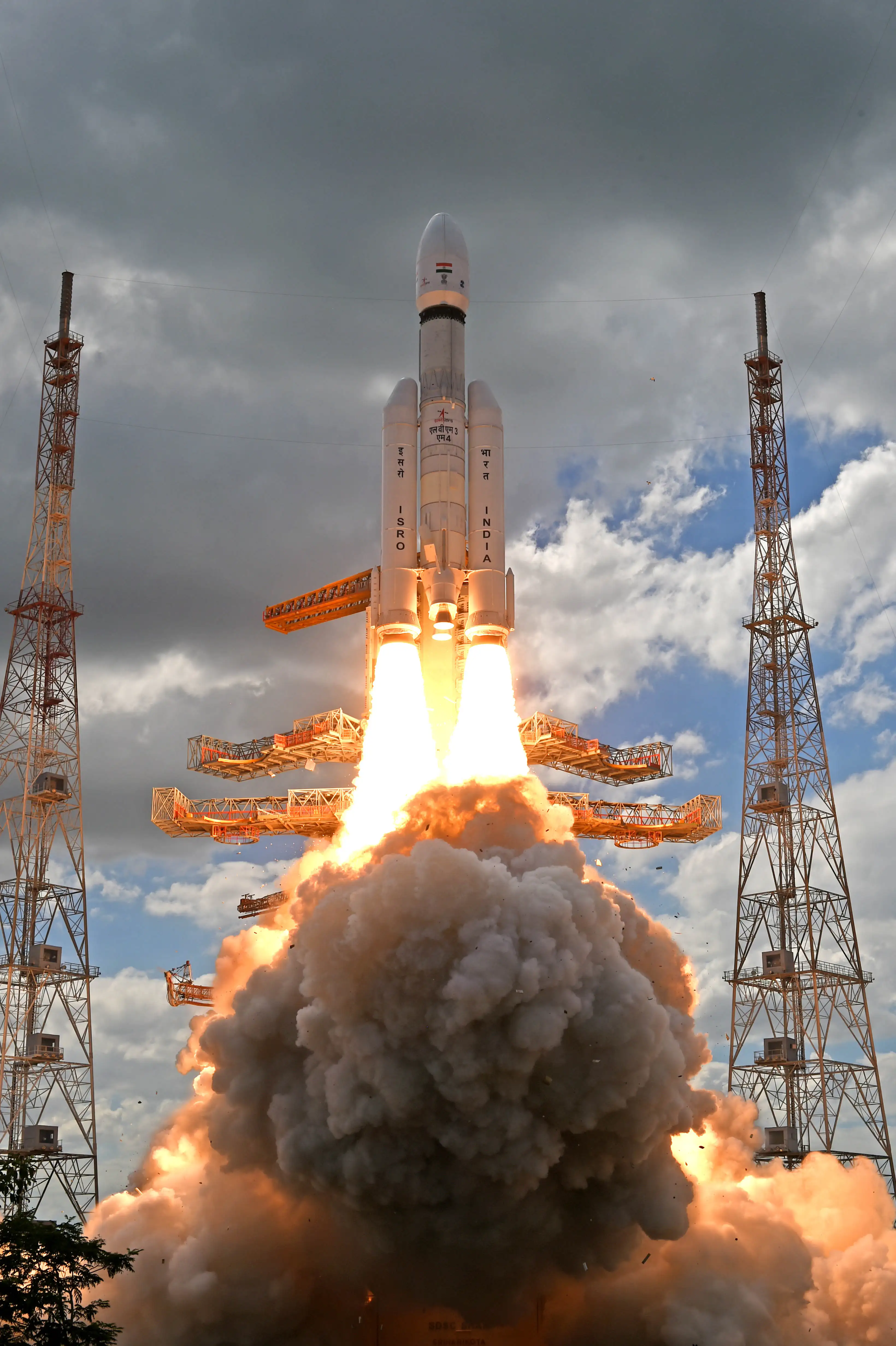
LVM3 M4 lifting off from SDSC SLP, carrying Chandrayaan-3 (2023)

== Notable missions ==
=== Flight X ===
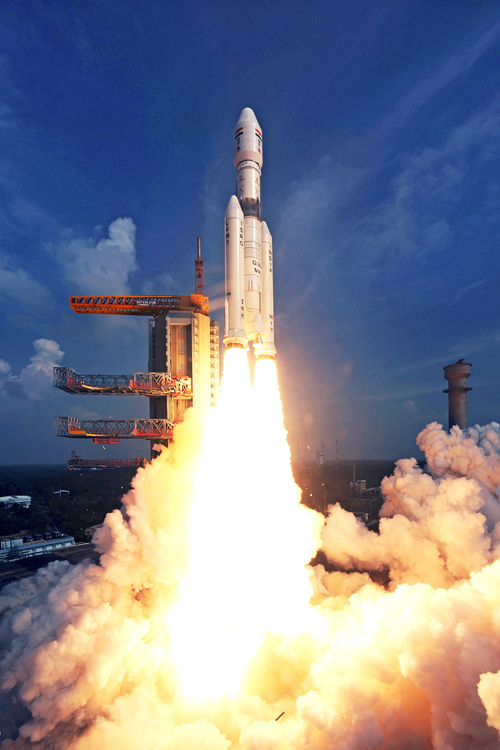
LVM3-X lifting off

The maiden flight of the LVM3 lifted off from the Second Launch Pad at the Satish Dhawan Space Center on 18 December 2014 at 04:00 UTC. The test had functional boosters, a core stage but carried dummy upper stage whose LOX and LH₂ tanks were filled with LN₂ and GN₂ respectively for simulating weight. It also carried the Crew Module Atmospheric Re-entry Experiment (CARE) that was tested on re-entry.

Just over five minutes into the flight, the rocket ejected CARE at an altitude of 126 kilometres (78 mi), which then descended, controlled by its onboard reaction control system. During the test, CARE's heat shield experienced a peak temperature of around 1,000 °C (1,830 °F). ISRO downlinked launch telemetry during the ballistic coasting phase until the radio black-out to avoid data loss in the event of a failure. At an altitude of around 15 kilometres (9.3 mi), the module's apex cover separated and the parachutes were deployed. CARE splashed down in the Bay of Bengal near the Andaman and Nicobar Islands and was recovered successfully.

=== Chandrayaan ===
Following the failure of Phobos-Grunt mission of Roscosmos, it resulted in a complete review of technical aspects connected with the spacecraft, which were also slotted to be used in the proposed Russian lander for Chandrayaan-2. This delayed the lander from Russia and eventually Roscosmos declared its inability to meet up with the revised time of 2015 for its launch on board an uprated GSLV rocket along with an Indian orbiter and rover. ISRO cancelled the Russian agreement and decided to go alone with its project with marginal changes.

On 22 July 2019, the LVM3 M1 (GSLV Mk.III M1) rocket lifted off with 3850 kg Chandrayaan-2 Orbiter-Lander composite and successfully injected it into a parking orbit of 169.7 x 45,475 km. This marked the first operational flight of LVM3 after two developmental flights. The apogee of the earth parking orbit is about 6,000 km more than originally envisaged and thereby eliminated one of the seven earth-bound orbit raising manoeuvres. It was attributed to a 15 percentage increase in rocket performance. On 14 July 2023, the LVM3 M4 rocket successfully injected the 3900 kg Chandrayaan-3 composite to a parking orbit of 170 x 36,500 km. On 15 November 2023, the Cryogenic Upper Stage (C25) of the LVM3 M4 (NORAD ID: 57321) made an uncontrolled re-entry into the Earth's atmosphere around 9:12 UTC. The impact point is predicted over the North Pacific Ocean and the final ground track did not pass over India.

=== OneWeb ===
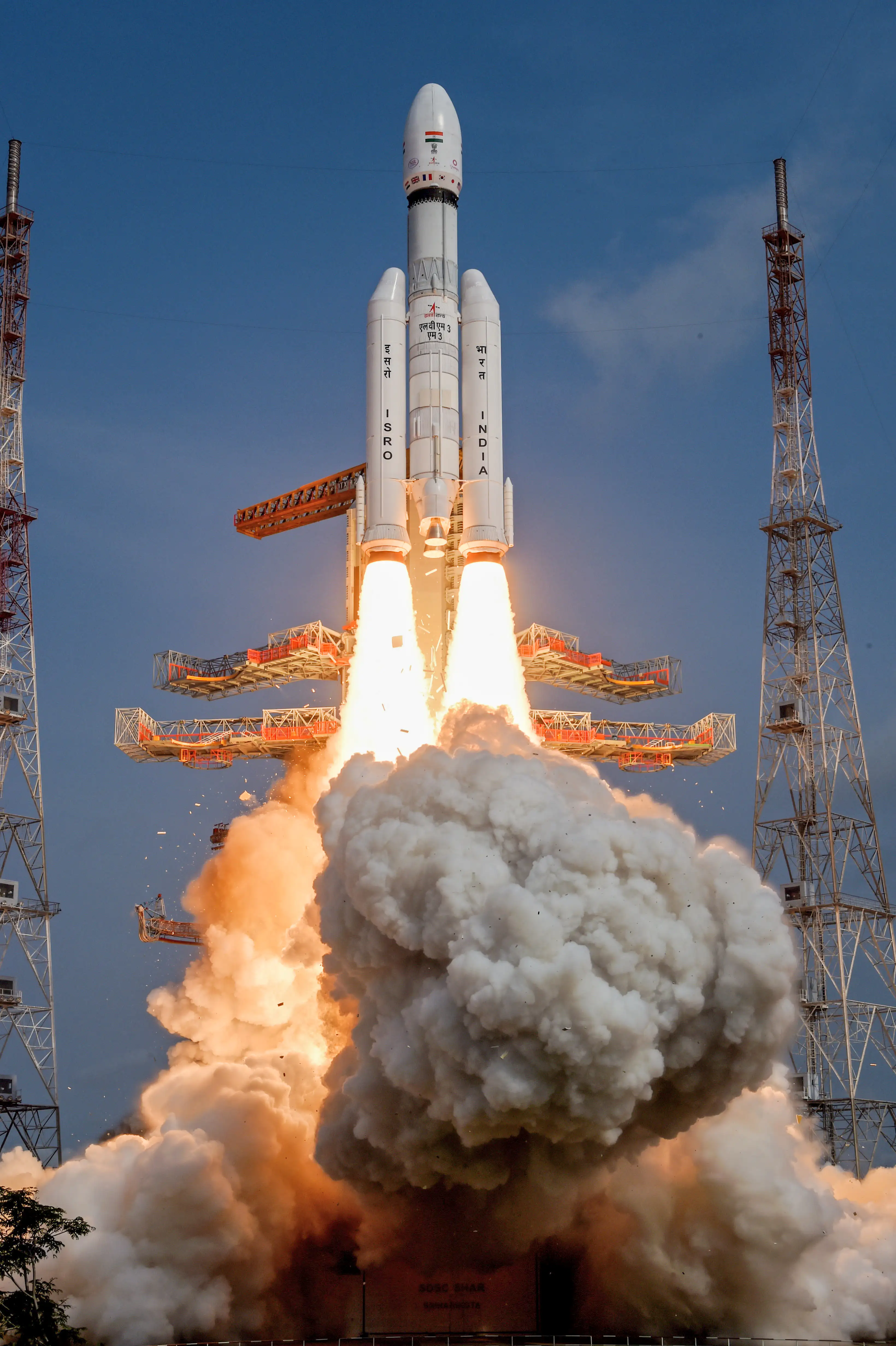
LVM3 M3 OneWeb India-2 Mission

On 21 March 2022, OneWeb announced that it had signed a launch agreement with United States launch provider SpaceX to launch the remaining 1st generation satellites on Falcon 9 rockets, with the first launch expected no earlier than summer 2022. On 20 April 2022 OneWeb announced a similar deal with NewSpace India Limited, the commercial arm of the Indian Space Research Organisation. OneWeb satellites were deployed by LVM3 both on 22 October 2022 and 26 March 2023 using a lightly modified version of the satellite dispenser previously used on Soyuz.

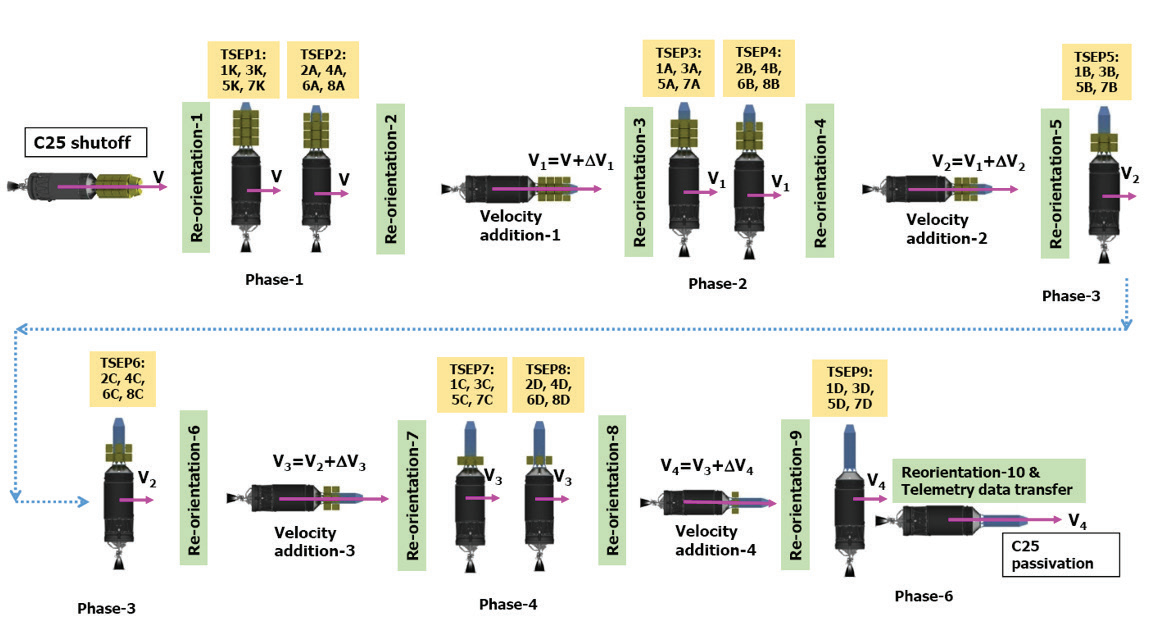
Post C25 Shut-off Phase Flight Profile for deployment of 36 OneWeb satellites

The first batch of 36 OneWeb Gen-1 satellites weighing a total of 5796 kg was launched onboard LVM3 M2 rocket codenamed OneWeb India-1 Mission on 22 October 2022 and the satellites were injected to a low earth orbit of 601 km altitude and 87.4° inclination on a sequential basis. This constituted the first commercial mission and the first multi-satellite mission to low earth orbit of the rocket, marking its entry to global commercial launch service market. The separation of satellites involved a unique maneuver of the cryogenic stage to undergo several re-orientation and velocity additions covering 9 phases spanning 75 minutes.

On 26 March 2023, codenamed OneWeb India-2 Mission, the second batch of 36 satellites was launched onboard LVM3 M3 and injected to an altitude of 450 km with same inclination. The launch featured a white cryogenic stage which takes into account environmental-friendly manufacturing processes, better insulation properties and the use of lightweight materials.

== Statistics ==
LVM3 has accumulated a total of 9 launches, as of 24 December 2025. Of these, all 9 have been successful, giving it a cumulative success rate of 100%.

- Failure
- Partial failure
- Success
- Planned

Decade-wise summary of LVM3 launches

Decade	Successful	Partial success	Failure	Total
2010s	4	0	0	4
2020s	5	0	0	5
Total	9	0	0	9

== Launch history ==
=== 2014–2019 ===
Date/Time (UTC)	Payload	Launch site	Regime	Status
Date/Time (UTC)	Payload	Flight Number	Operator	Function
Date/Time (UTC)	Remarks			
18 December 2014; 4:00	(India) CARE; 3,775 kg (8,322 lb)	Satish Dhawan - SLP	Sub-orbital	Success
18 December 2014; 4:00	(India) CARE; 3,775 kg (8,322 lb)	LVM3-X	ISRO	Sub-orbital test of Re-entry Module
18 December 2014; 4:00	Sub-orbital developmental test flight with a non-functional cryogenic stage. The CARE module separated from the launch vehicle at an intended altitude of 126 km at a speed of 5.3 km/s. The launch validated the ignition, performance and separation aspects of S200 and L110 stages.			
5 June 2017; 11:58	(India) GSAT-19; 3,136 kg (6,914 lb)	Satish Dhawan - SLP	GTO	Success
5 June 2017; 11:58	(India) GSAT-19; 3,136 kg (6,914 lb)	LVM3-D1	INSAT	Communication
5 June 2017; 11:58	First developmental test launch with an operational cryogenic engine. The satellite was successfully injected to a parking orbit of 170 x 35,975 km with 21.5° inclination. The launch featured an ogive fairing and slanted nose cones on S200 stages to improve aerodynamic performance.			
14 November 2018; 11:38	(India) GSAT-29; 3,423 kg (7,546 lb)	Satish Dhawan - SLP	GTO	Success
14 November 2018; 11:38	(India) GSAT-29; 3,423 kg (7,546 lb)	LVM3-D2	INSAT	Communication
14 November 2018; 11:38	Second developmental test flight in full operational configuration. The satellite was successfully injected to an elongated parking orbit of 190 x 35,975 km with 21.5° inclination. L110 core used upgraded High Thrust Vikas Engines (HTVE). Developmental test flights of the rocket has completed.			
22 July 2019; 09:13	(India) Chandrayaan-2; 3,850 kg (8,490 lb)	Satish Dhawan - SLP	EPO	Success
22 July 2019; 09:13	(India) Chandrayaan-2; 3,850 kg (8,490 lb)	LVM3-M1	ISRO	Lunar Composite
22 July 2019; 09:13	First operational launch of the rocket and successfully injected a lunar Orbiter-Lander-Rover composite spacecraft to a parking orbit of 169.7 x 45,475 km. Chairman stated a 15 percentage increment in vehicle performance which eliminated one of the scheduled seven earth-bound orbit raising burns.			
=== 2020–2029 ===
Date/Time (UTC)	Payload (& Mass)	Launch site	Regime	Status
Date/Time (UTC)	Payload (& Mass)	Flight Number	Operator	Function
Date/Time (UTC)	Remarks			
22 October 2022; 18:37	(United Kingdom) 36 x OneWeb Gen-1; 5,796 kg (12,778 lb)	Satish Dhawan - SLP	LEO	Success
22 October 2022; 18:37	(United Kingdom) 36 x OneWeb Gen-1; 5,796 kg (12,778 lb)	LVM3-M2	OneWeb	Broadband Internet
22 October 2022; 18:37	First commercial launch of the rocket under NSIL and its first multi-satellite mission to low earth orbit of 601 km. The cryogenic stage performed multiple reorientation and velocity addition maneuvers to sequentially dispose the satellites. The rocket made its entry to global commercial launch service market.			
26 March 2023; 03:30	(United Kingdom) 36 x OneWeb Gen-1; 5,805 kg (12,798 lb)	Satish Dhawan - SLP	LEO	Success
26 March 2023; 03:30	(United Kingdom) 36 x OneWeb Gen-1; 5,805 kg (12,798 lb)	LVM3-M3	OneWeb	Broadband Internet
26 March 2023; 03:30	Second batch of 36 OneWeb Gen-1 satellites launched successfully to low earth orbit of 450 km with 87.4° inclination. The launch featured a white cryogenic stage (C25) which has more environmental-friendly manufacturing processes, better insulation properties and the use of lightweight materials.			
14 July 2023; 09:05	(India) Chandrayaan-3; 3,895 kg (8,587 lb)	Satish Dhawan - SLP	EPO	Success
14 July 2023; 09:05	(India) Chandrayaan-3; 3,895 kg (8,587 lb)	LVM3-M4	ISRO	Lunar Composite
14 July 2023; 09:05	The rocket successfully injected a lunar composite spacecraft of Propulsion Module-Lander-Rover into an elliptical parking orbit of 170 x 36,500 km. On 15 November, the Cryogenic Upper Stage of the rocket made an uncontrolled re-entry around 9:12 UTC over the North Pacific Ocean.			
2 November 2025; 11:56	(India) GSAT-7R (CMS-03); 4,400 kg (9,700 lb)	Satish Dhawan - SLP	GTO	Success
2 November 2025; 11:56	(India) GSAT-7R (CMS-03); 4,400 kg (9,700 lb)	LVM3-M5	INSAT	Communication
2 November 2025; 11:56	With a mass of 4.4 tonnes, GSAT-7R is the heaviest geostationary satellite to be launched on LVM3 by ISRO. After Separation of GSAT-7R, LVM3's CE-20 upper stage engine reignited for the second burn for the first time. Replacement satellite for GSAT-7.			
24 December 2025; 03:25	(United States) BlueBird Block 2; 6,100 kg (13,400 lb)	Satish Dhawan - SLP	LEO	Success
24 December 2025; 03:25	(United States) BlueBird Block 2; 6,100 kg (13,400 lb)	LVM3-M6	AST SpaceMobile	Communication
24 December 2025; 03:25	Commercial launch under NSIL. Cellphone-compatible broadband constellation. The next-generation BlueBird Block 2 satellite delivers 10x the bandwidth of BlueBird Block 1 satellites, allowing continuous cellular broadband service coverage. It will feature a ~2,400 ft^{2} (220 m^{2}) communications array, the largest ever developed commercially. Following launch, the payload fairing washed up off the coast of Sampur, Trincomalee In Sri Lanka.			

== Future launches ==
Date/Time (UTC)	Payload	Launch site	Regime	Status
Date/Time (UTC)	Payload	Flight Number	Operator	Function
Date/Time (UTC)	Remarks			
December 2026	(India) GSAT-32 (GSAT-N3)	Satish Dhawan - SLP	GTO	Planned
December 2026	(India) GSAT-32 (GSAT-N3)	LVM3-M7	INSAT	Communication
NET 2027	(India) GSAT-22	Satish Dhawan- SLP	GTO	Planned
NET 2027	(India) GSAT-22		INSAT	Communication
NET 2027	(India) GSAT-23	Satish Dhawan- SLP	GTO	Planned
NET 2027	(India) GSAT-23		INSAT	Communication
NET 2027	(India) Chandrayaan-4 Propulsion Module; Chandrayaan-4 Lander Module; Chandrayaan-4 Ascender Module	Satish Dhawan - SLP	GTO	Planned
NET 2027	(India) Chandrayaan-4 Propulsion Module; Chandrayaan-4 Lander Module; Chandrayaan-4 Ascender Module	LVM3 SC	ISRO	Lunar Composite
NET 2027	(India) Chandrayaan-4 Transfer Module; Chandrayaan-4 Re-entry Module	Satish Dhawan - SLP	GTO	Planned
NET 2027	(India) Chandrayaan-4 Transfer Module; Chandrayaan-4 Re-entry Module	LVM3 SC	ISRO	Lunar Composite
29 March 2028	(India) Venus Orbiter Mission	Satish Dhawan - SLP	GTO	Planned
29 March 2028	(India) Venus Orbiter Mission		ISRO	
NET 2030	(India) Mars Lander Mission	Satish Dhawan - SLP	GTO	Planned
NET 2030	(India) Mars Lander Mission		ISRO	
NET 2028	(India) BAS-B1; 9,186 kg (20,252 lb)	Satish Dhawan - SLP	LEO	Scheduled
NET 2028	(India) BAS-B1; 9,186 kg (20,252 lb)		ISRO	Space Station
NET 2028	First module launch of Bharatiya Antariksh Station.			
2028-30	(India) NVS-06 (IRNSS-1O); NVS-07 (IRNSS-1P); NVS-08 (IRNSS-1Q); NVS-09 (IRNSS-1R)	Satish Dhawan - SLP		Planned
2028-30	(India) NVS-06 (IRNSS-1O); NVS-07 (IRNSS-1P); NVS-08 (IRNSS-1Q); NVS-09 (IRNSS-1R)		ISRO	
NET 2030	(India) BAS-B2	Satish Dhawan - SLP	LEO	Scheduled
NET 2030	(India) BAS-B2		ISRO	Space Station
NET 2030	Second module launch of Bharatiya Antariksh Station.			
NET 2031-32	(India) Lunar Navcom × 3	Satish Dhawan - SLP	Selenocentric	Planned
NET 2031-32	(India) Lunar Navcom × 3		ISRO	
NET 2031-32	First of Two launches carrying 3 satellites for Lunar Navcom Data Relay and Navigation satellite.			
NET 2031-32	(India) Lunar Navcom × 3	Satish Dhawan - SLP	Selenocentric	Planned
NET 2031-32	(India) Lunar Navcom × 3		ISRO	
NET 2031-32	Second of Two launches carrying 3 satellites for Lunar Navcom Data Relay and Navigation satellite.			
NET 2032	(India) BAS-B5	Satish Dhawan - SLP	LEO	Scheduled
NET 2032	(India) BAS-B5		ISRO	Space Station
NET 2032	Fifth module launch of Bharatiya Antariksh Station.			
NET 2033	(India) BAS-B3	Satish Dhawan - SLP	LEO	Scheduled
NET 2033	(India) BAS-B3		ISRO	Space Station
NET 2033	Third module launch of Bharatiya Antariksh Station.			
NET 2034	(India) BAS-B4	Satish Dhawan - SLP	LEO	Scheduled
NET 2034	(India) BAS-B4		ISRO	Space Station
NET 2034	Fourth module launch of Bharatiya Antariksh Station.			

== Human-rated missions ==
Launch Log
Date/Time (UTC)	Payload	Launch site	Regime	Status
Date/Time (UTC)	Payload	Flight Number	Operator	Function
Date/Time (UTC)	Remarks			
Orbital Test Flights
November 2026	(India) G1	LP2 - SDSC SHAR	LEO	Integration and testing
November 2026	(India) G1	HLVM3	ISRO	Test flight
November 2026	The seventh operational flight of the LVM3 rocket and the first test flight of the Gaganyaan capsule. The spacecraft will be launched into an orbit of 170×408 km, perform a circularization burn, and test re-entry and recovery sequences in ocean waters. The spacecraft will carry the Humanoid robot Vyommitra, accompanied by scientific payloads including fruit flies to simulate the effects of radiation exposure and microgravity on the human body. During the flight various experiments will be carried out for future crewed missions.			
TBA	(India) G2	LP2 - SDSC SHAR	LEO	Planned
TBA	(India) G2	HLVM3	ISRO	Test flight
TBA	Second orbital test flight of Gaganyaan spacecraft.			
TBA	(India) G3	LP2 - SDSC SHAR	LEO	Planned
TBA	(India) G3	HLVM3	ISRO	Test flight
TBA	Third orbital test flight of Gaganyaan spacecraft.			
Crewed Flights
NET 2027	(India) H1	LP2 - SDSC SHAR	LEO	Planned
NET 2027	(India) H1	HLVM3	ISRO	Crewed mission
NET 2027	First crewed flight of Gaganyaan spacecraft, carrying one to three Indian astronauts on a short orbital test flight. Launch mass is 7,800 kg (17,200 lb) with service module, capsule's mass is 3,735 kg (8,234 lb).			
TBA	(India) H2	LP2 - SDSC SHAR	LEO	Scheduled
TBA	(India) H2	HLVM3	ISRO	
TBA	Second crewed flight of Gaganyaan spacecraft, carrying one to three Indian astronauts on a short orbital test flight. Launch mass is 7,800 kg (17,200 lb) with service module, capsule's mass is 3,735 kg (8,234 lb).			
Cargo Flights
TBA	(India) G4	LP2 - SDSC SHAR	LEO (ISS)	Scheduled
TBA	(India) G4	HLVM3	ISRO	Resupply Spacecraft
TBA	ISRO’s first ISS cargo resupply mission.			
TBA	(India) G5	LP2 - SDSC SHAR	LEO (BAS)	Scheduled
TBA	(India) G5	HLVM3	ISRO	Resupply Spacecraft
TBA	ISRO’s first BAS cargo resupply mission.			

== Gallery ==
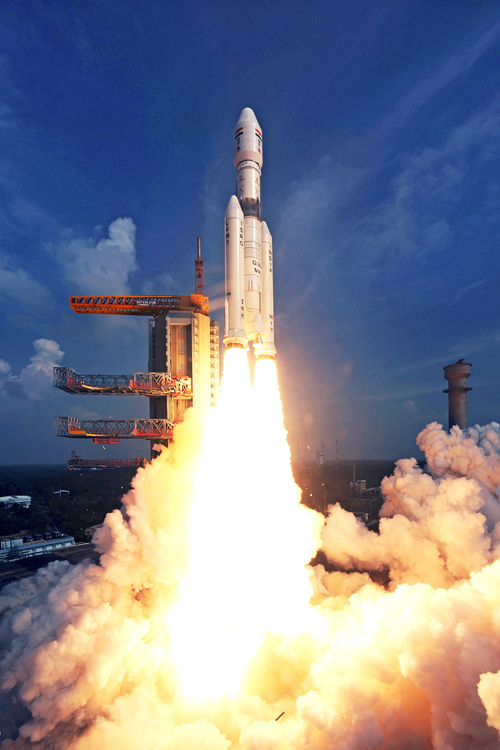
X/CARE

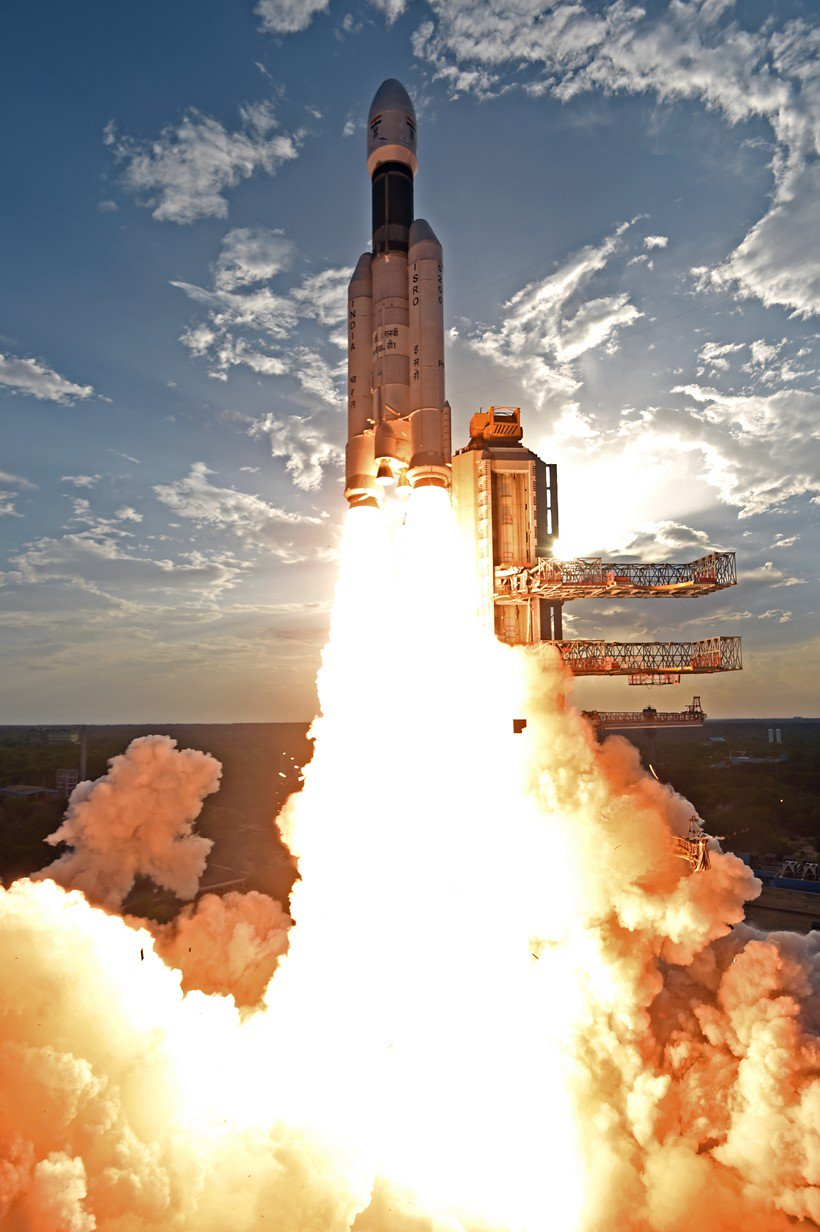
D1/GSAT-19

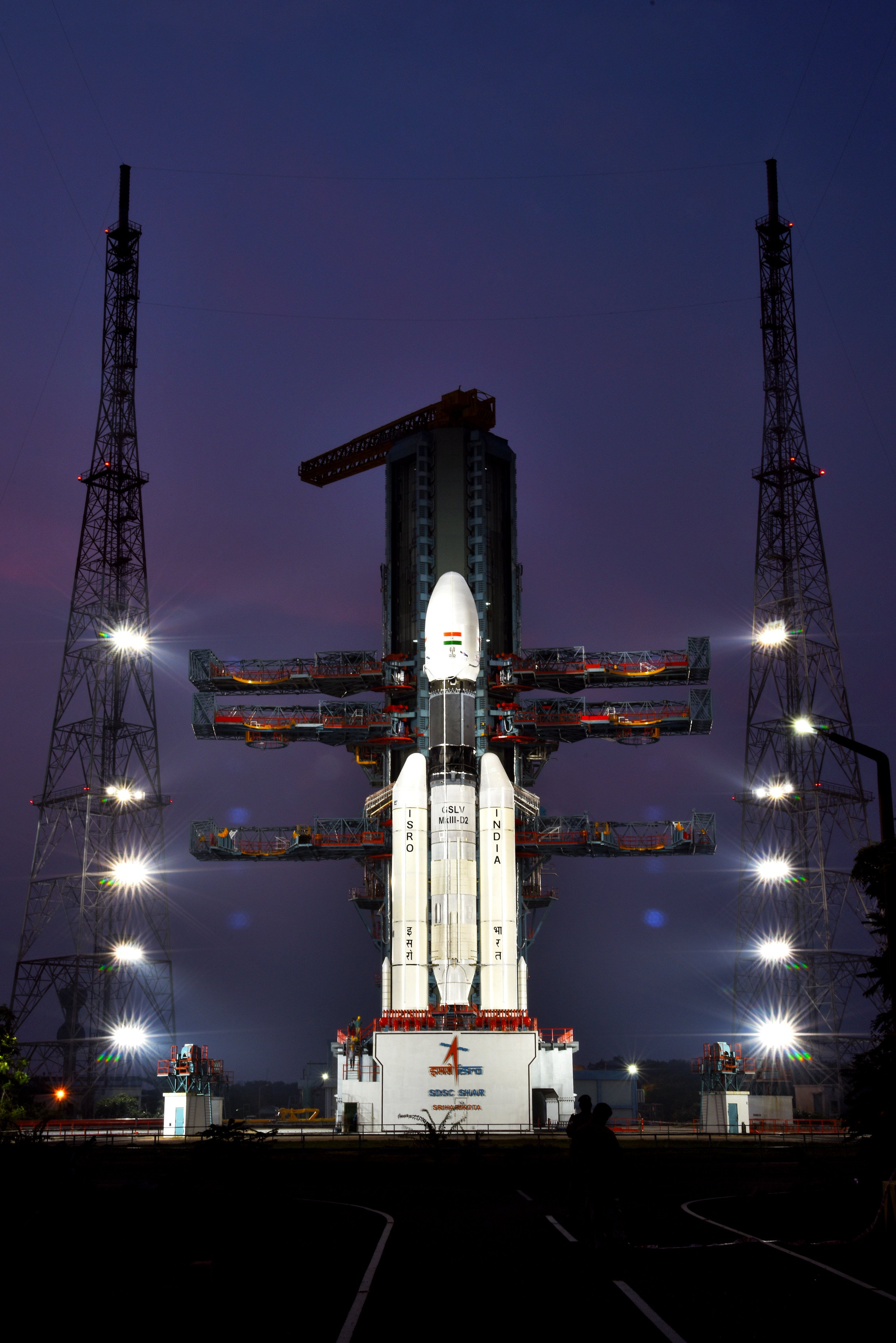
D2/GSAT-29

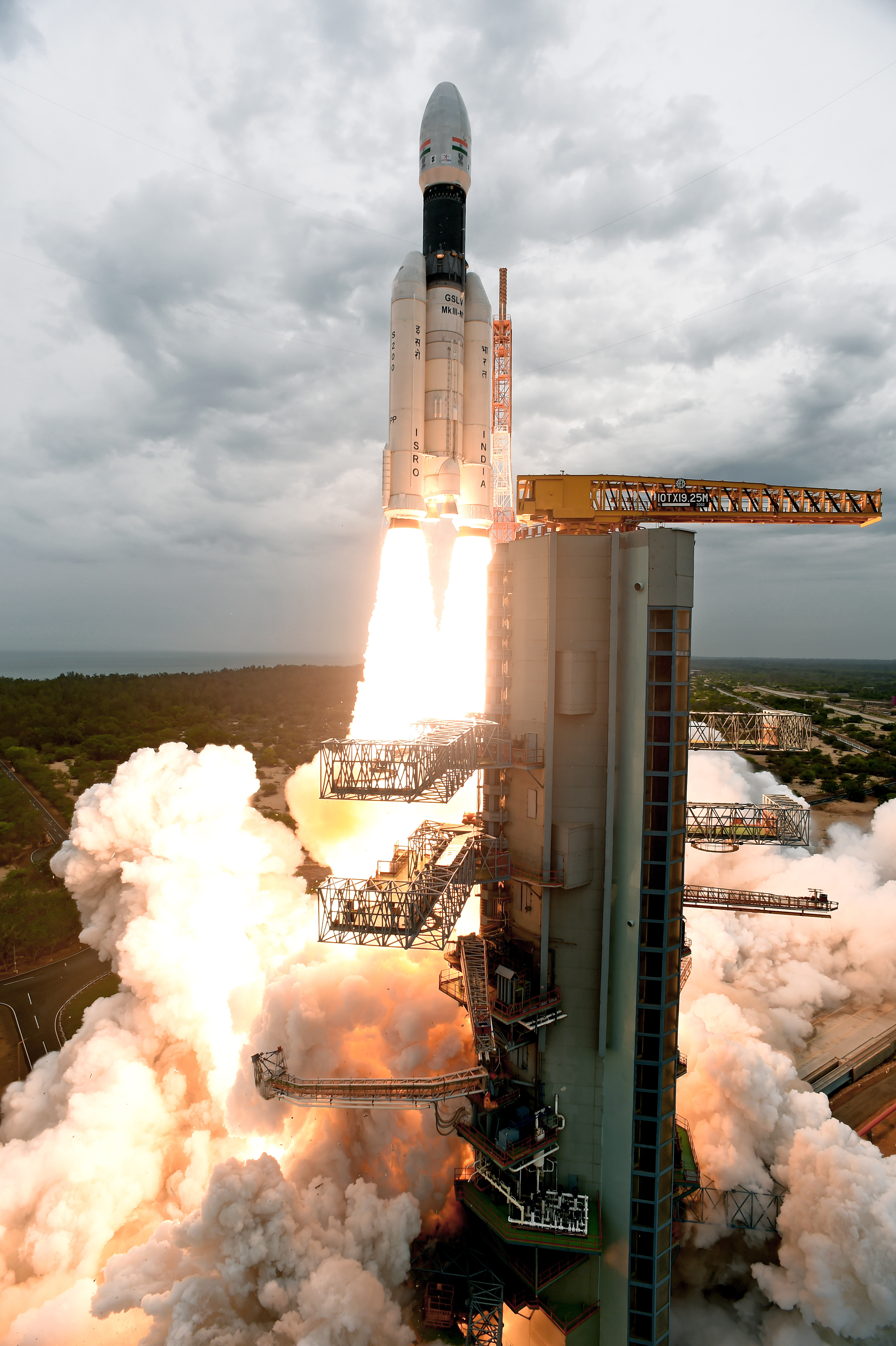
M1/Chandrayaan-2

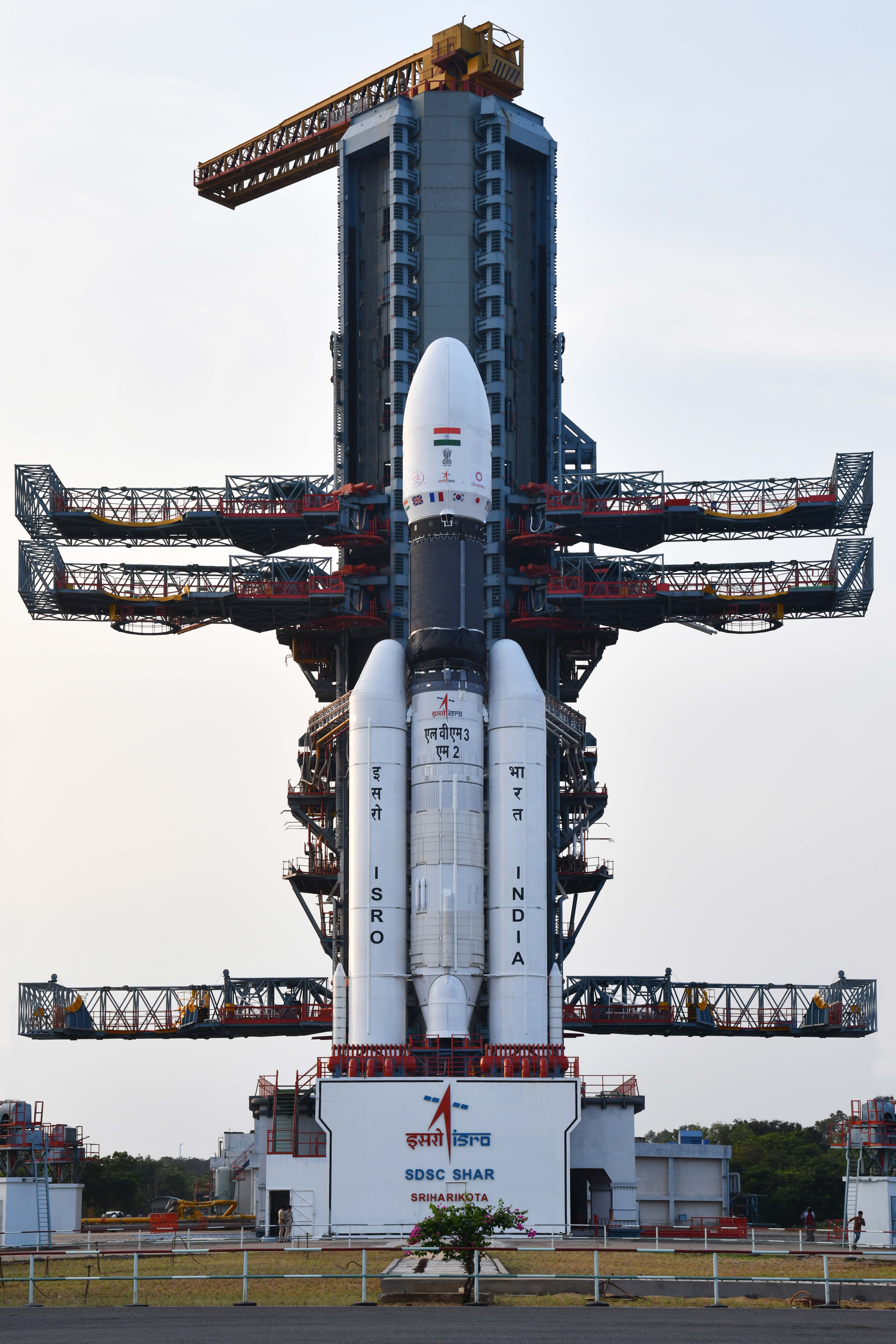
M2/OneWeb 14

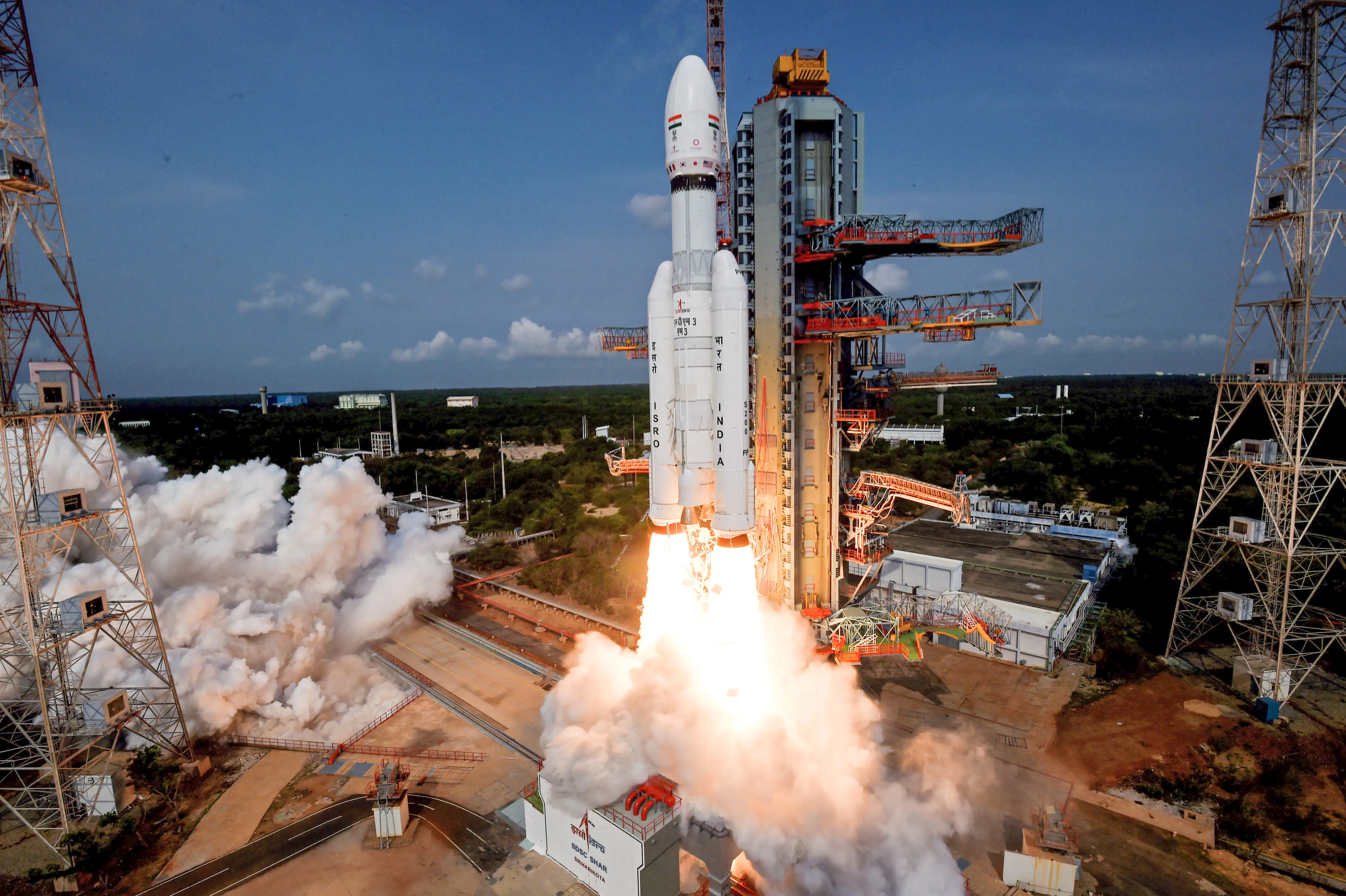
M3/OneWeb 18

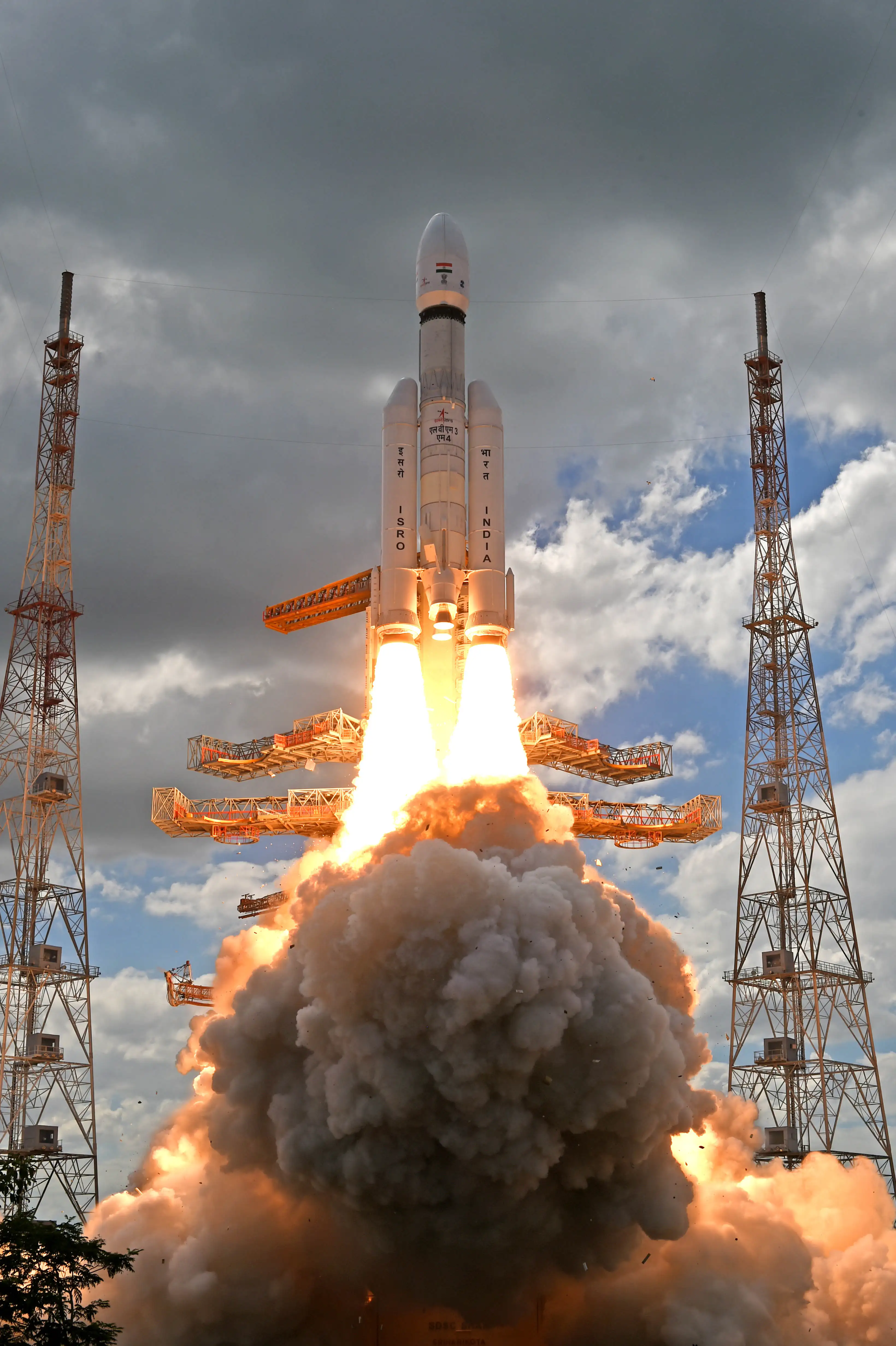
M4/Chandrayaan-3

M5/GSAT-7R

M6/BlueBird Block 2

== See also ==
- List of GSLV launches
- List of PSLV launches
- List of SSLV launches
