= LVM3-M3 =

2023 Indian satellite launch

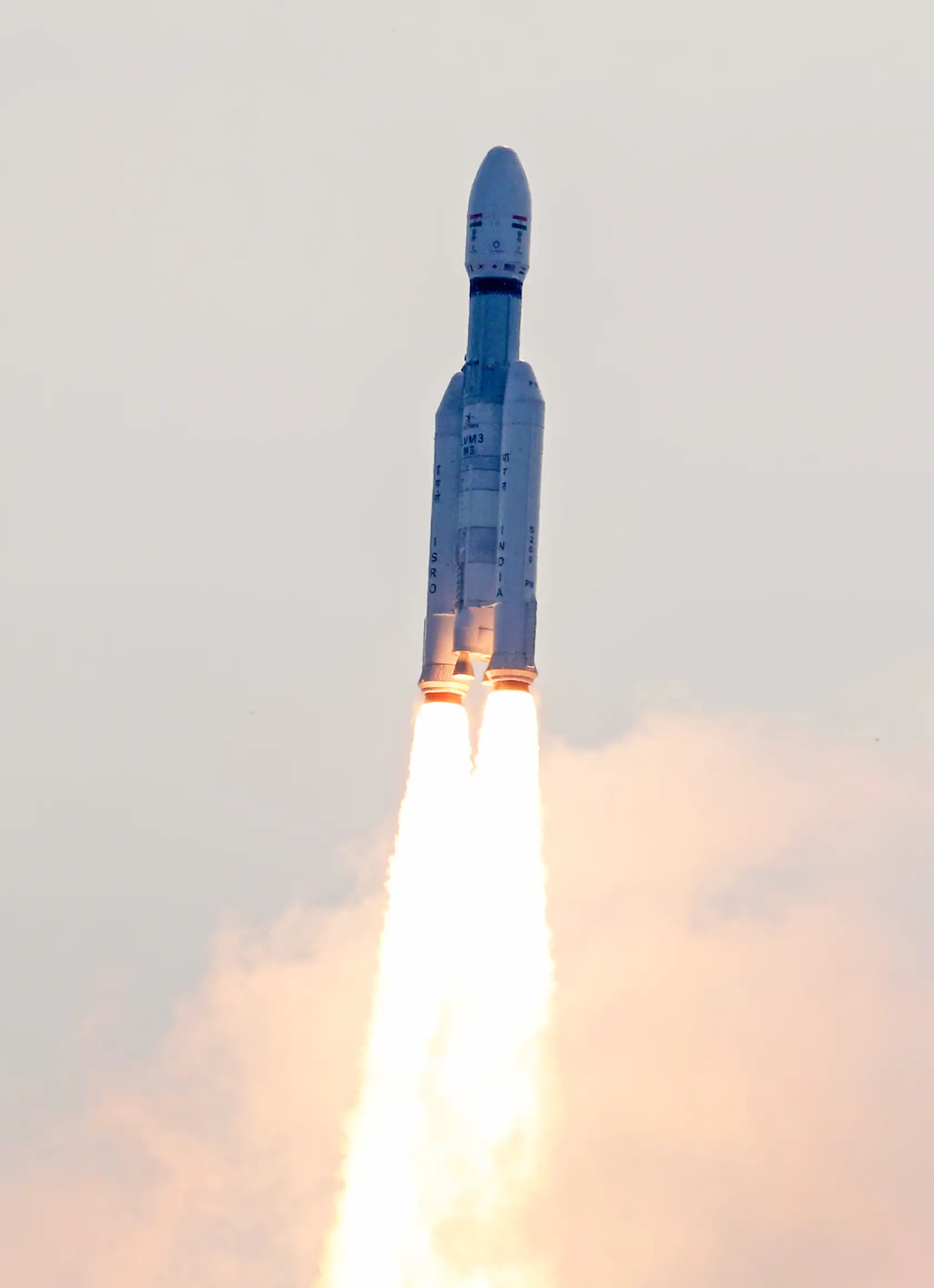

LVM-3 launch
- Launch: 26 March 2023; 09:00 IST (UTC +5:30)
- Operator: ISRO
- Pad: SDSC SLP
- Payload: 36 Oneweb Gen-1
- Outcome: Success

List of LVM3 launches

The LVM3-M2 was the sixth launch of India's LVM3 launch vehicle. It was the second commercial launch of the rocket under NSIL and it was a multi-satellite mission to low earth orbit. The cryogenic stage performed multiple reorientation and velocity addition maneuvers to sequentially dispose the satellites.

== Payload ==
On 20 April 2022 OneWeb announced a deal with NewSpace India Limited, the commercial arm of the Indian Space Research Organisation. OneWeb satellites were to be deployed by LVM 3 using a lightly modified version of the satellite dispenser previously used on Soyuz rockets, a plan cancelled after the 2022 Russian invasion of Ukraine. The mission was also referred to as Oneweb India-2 campaign.

The flight carried a second batch of 36 OneWeb Gen-1 satellites to low earth orbit of 450 km with 87.4° inclination. The launch featured a newer white coat of insulation on the cryogenic stage (C25) which has more environmental-friendly manufacturing processes, better insulation properties and the use of lightweight materials. The vehicle took off with a total payload of 5,805 kg at 09:00:20 hours IST from the second launch pad at SDSC-SHAR, Sriharikota. It achieved satellite injection conditions in about 17 minutes and began injecting the satellites from the twentieth minute. The vehicle performed a sophisticated manoeuvre to orient in orthogonal directions and injected the satellites into precise orbits with defined time-gaps to avoid collision of the satellites. It was Oneweb's 18th launch and brought the constellation to 618 satellites.

== Gallery ==
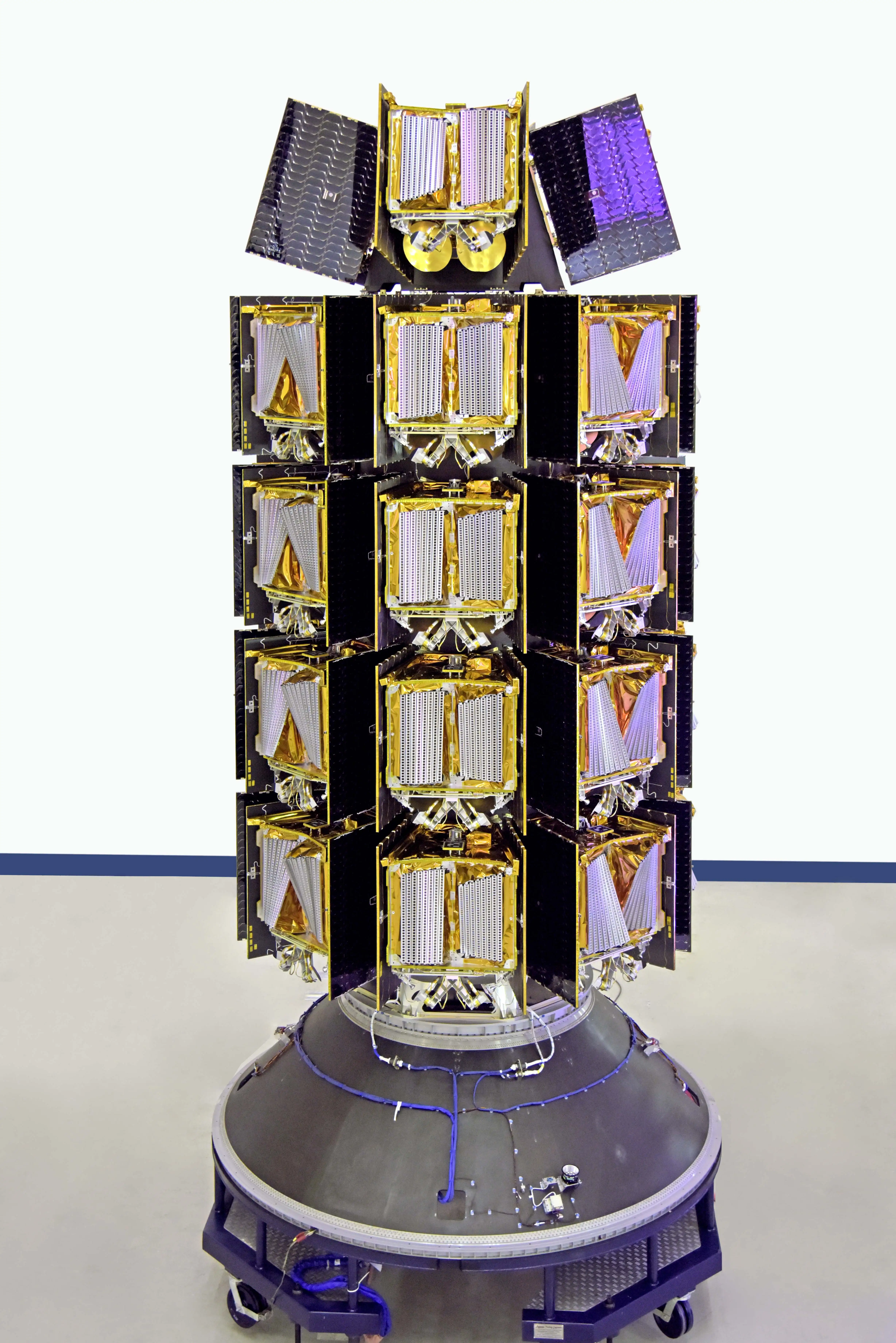

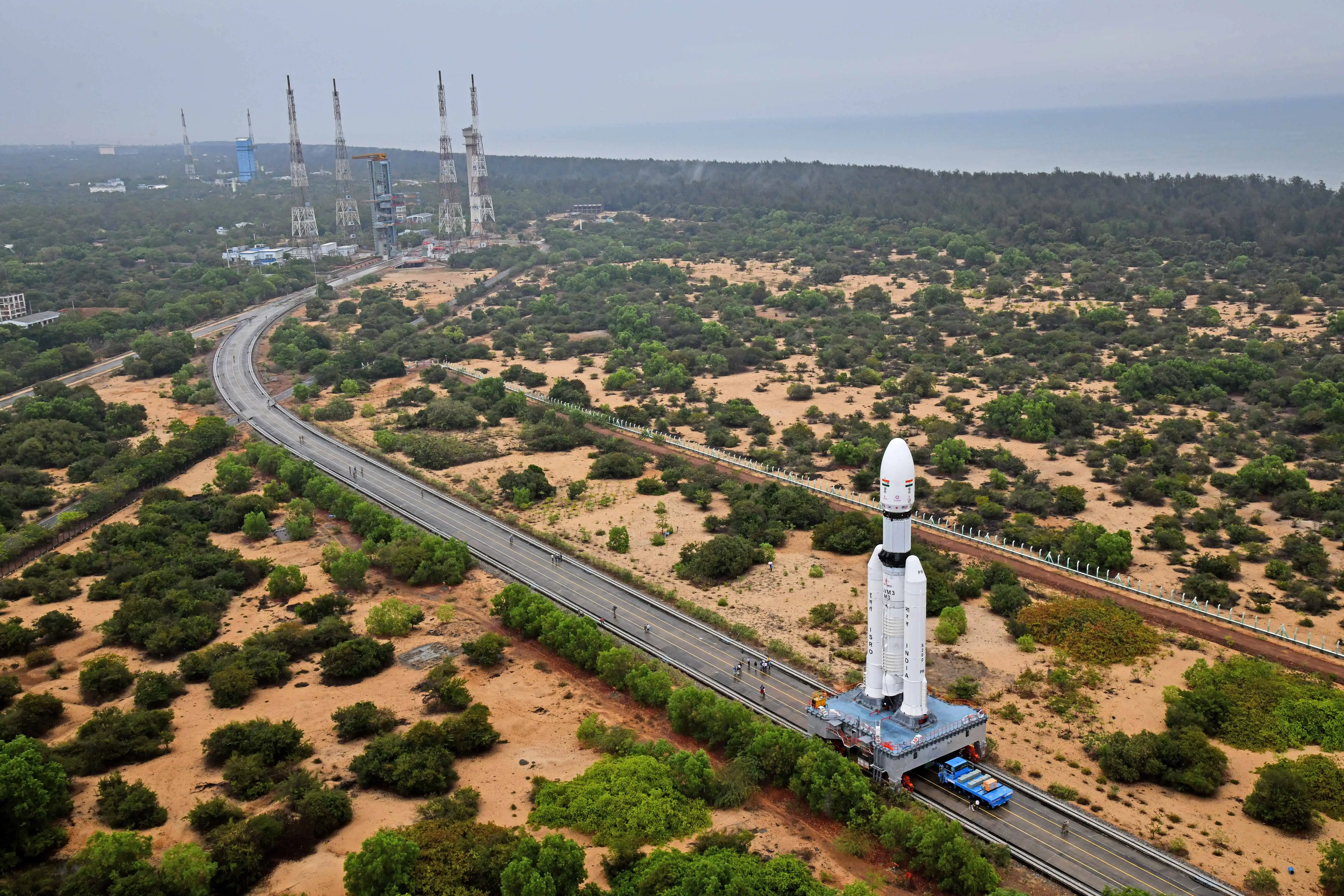

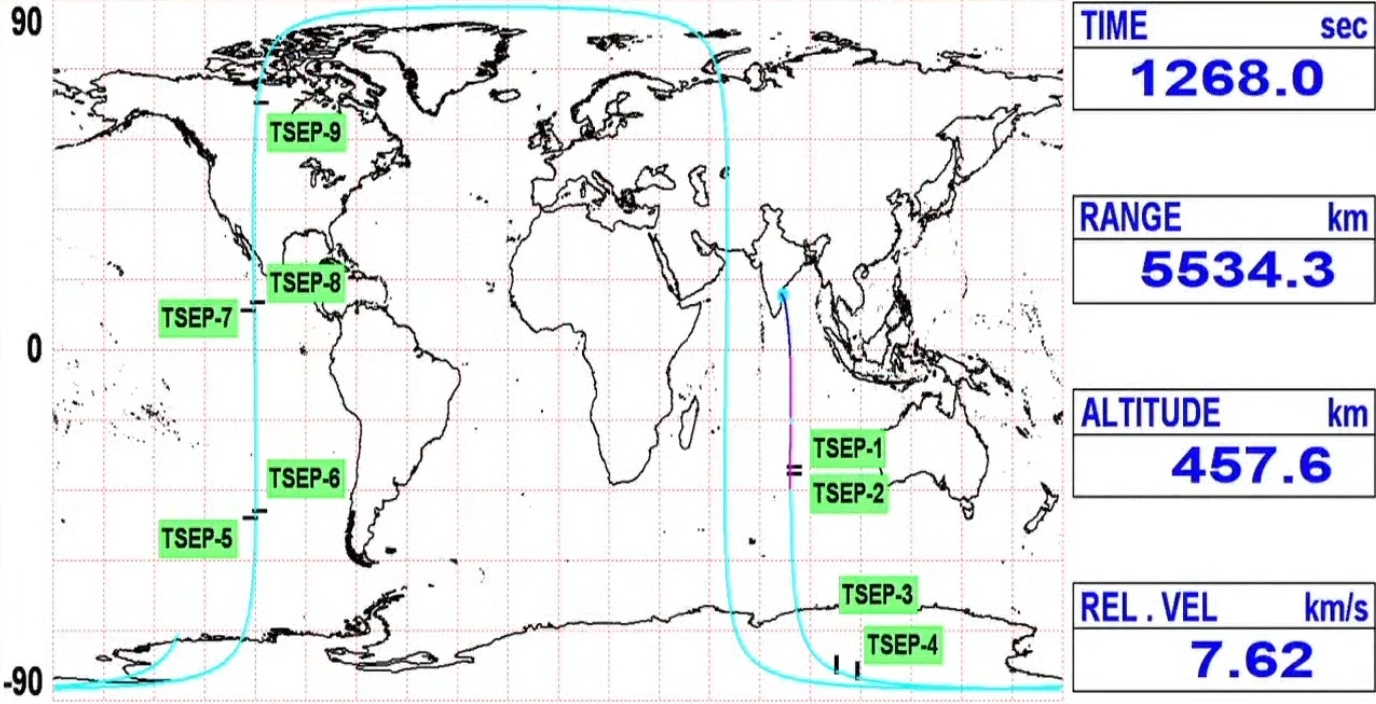

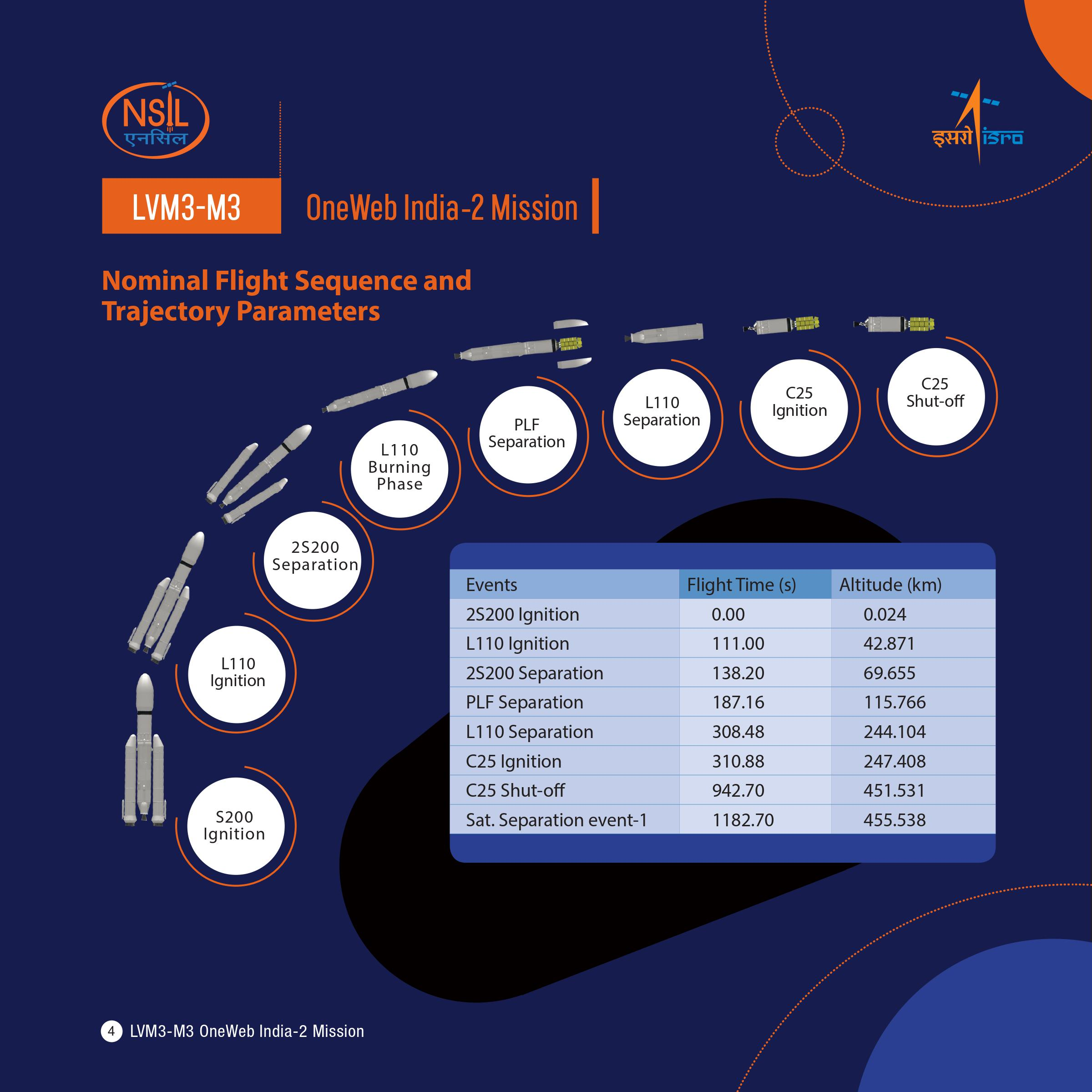

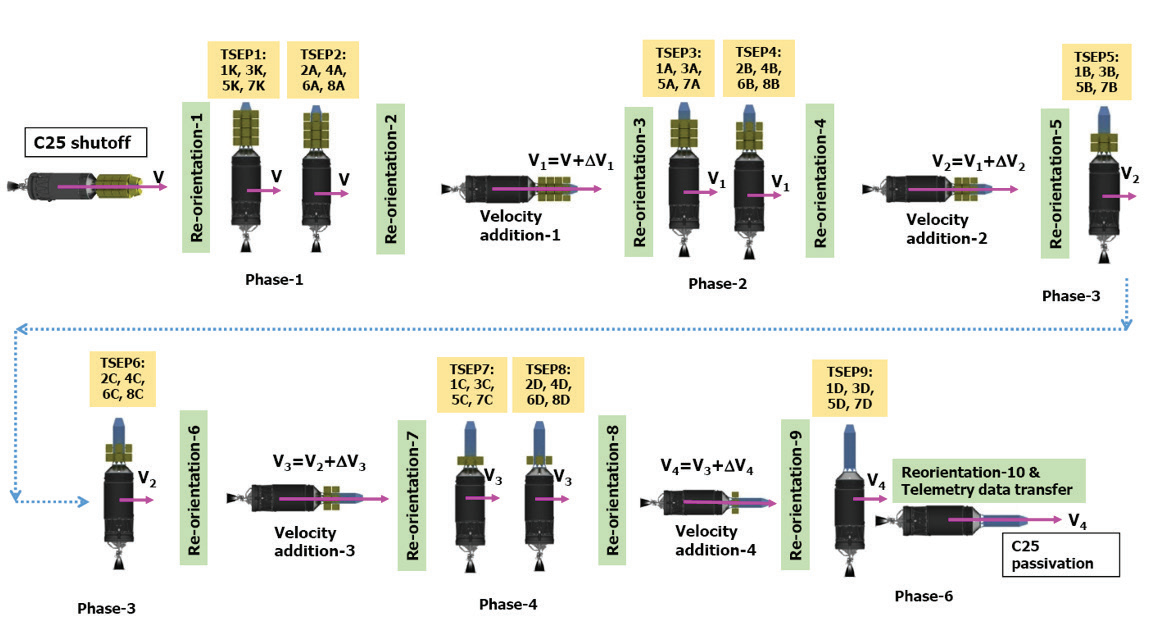

== Mission overview ==
- Mass:
  - Payload weight: 5,805 kg
- Overall height: 43.5 m (143 ft)
- Propellant:
  - Boosters (S200) : HTPB/AP
  - Stage 1 (L110) : UDMH/N_{2}O_{2}
  - Stage 2 (C-25): LOX/ LH2
- Propellant mass:
  - Stage 1: 205,000 kg (452,000 lb)
  - Stage 2: 116,000 kg (256,000 lb)
  - Stage 3: 28,000 kg (62,000 lb)
- Altitude: 450 km
- Inclination: 87.4°
- Semi Major Axis: 6828.137 km
- Launch Azimuth:138°

== See also ==
- ISRO
- Starlink
- PSLV
