= Blacklift =

Space launch vehicle

- Function: BlueBird satellite launches
- Manufacturer: AST SpaceMobile
- Country of origin: United States

Capacity

Payload to LEO
- Mass: 40,000 lb (18,000 kg)

Associated rockets
- Comparable: Falcon 9

Blacklift is an in development fully reusable two-stage-to-orbit medium-lift launch vehicle designed and manufactured in the United States by AST SpaceMobile with engines provided by Firefly Aerospace as a replacement to SpaceX's Falcon 9 which is being phased out for Starship. Blacklift was announced on November 6, 2026, and is targeting a first flight in 2028.

== Development history ==
AST SpaceMobile had been one of SpaceX's repeat customers, launching their BlueBird satellites on Falcon 9, however, on August 24, 2026, SpaceX announced that they would phase out Falcon 9 launches once Starship is "up and running." Seeking further vertical integration, AST SpaceMobile announced the Blacklift as a way to return BlueBird to flight, without depending on an outside launch provider.

Blacklift will also be used to launch payloads for the U.S. government as part of the Defense Priorities and Allocations System program.

== Design ==
In their announcement, AST SpaceMobile also announced that Firefly Aerospace would be manufacturing and providing Miranda and Vira engines for the first three Blacklift launches, afterwards, AST SpaceMobile will manufacturer them under license. AST SpaceMobile paid $500 million for the engines for the first three rockets and an additional $700 million to license the production of Firefly's engines going forward. AST SpaceMobile President Scott Wisniewski stated that outsourcing the engines would "allow us to leapfrog the traditional five-to-10-year development cycle."

The rocket will consists of two stages, the first stage with 11 Miranda engines, and a second stage for orbital insertion with a Vira engine. Both stages will be fitted with grid fins with the intent to be fully reusable. Blacklift will be able to send 20 tons to low earth orbit and will be used to launch 5 BlueBird satellites at a time.
