= LVM3-M2 =

2022 Indian satellite launch

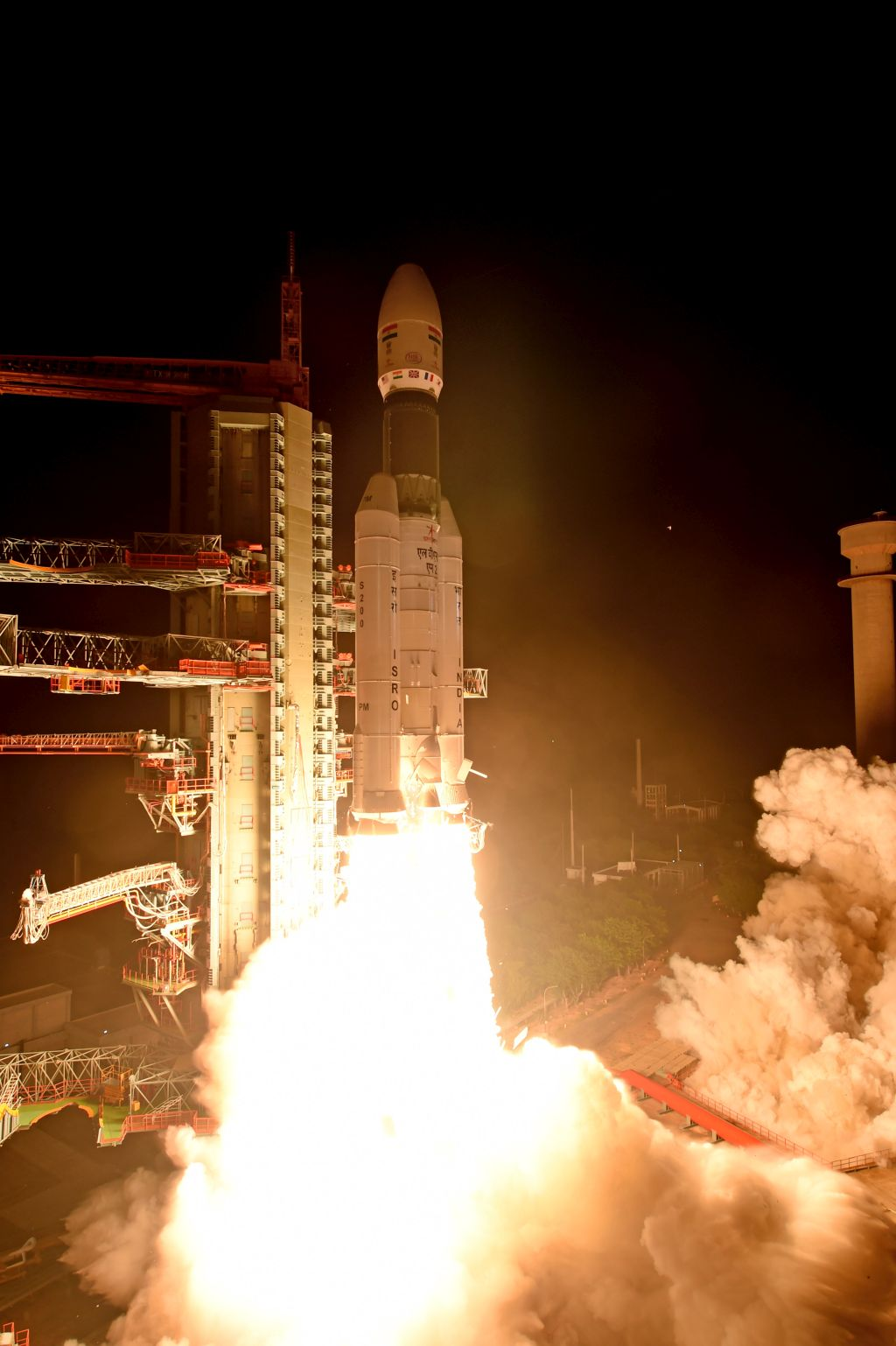

LVM-3 launch
- Launch: 22 October 2022; 00:07 IST (UTC +5:30)
- Operator: ISRO
- Pad: SDSC SLP
- Payload: 36 Oneweb Gen-1
- Outcome: Success

List of LVM3 launches

The LVM3-M2 was the fifth launch of ISRO's LVM3 launch vehicle. It was the first commercial launch of the rocket under NSIL and its first multi-satellite mission to low earth orbit. The cryogenic stage performed multiple reorientation and velocity addition maneuvers to sequentially dispose the satellites.

== Payload ==
On 20 April 2022 OneWeb announced a deal with NewSpace India Limited, the commercial arm of the Indian Space Research Organisation. OneWeb satellites were to be deployed by LVM 3 using a lightly modified version of the satellite dispenser previously used on Soyuz rockets, a plan cancelled after the 2022 Russian invasion of Ukraine. The mission was also referred to as Oneweb India-1 campaign.

The separation of satellites involved a unique maneuver of the cryogenic stage to orientation and re-orientation covering 9 phases spanning 75 minutes.This was OneWeb's 14th launch, bringing their constellation to 462 satellites.

== Gallery ==
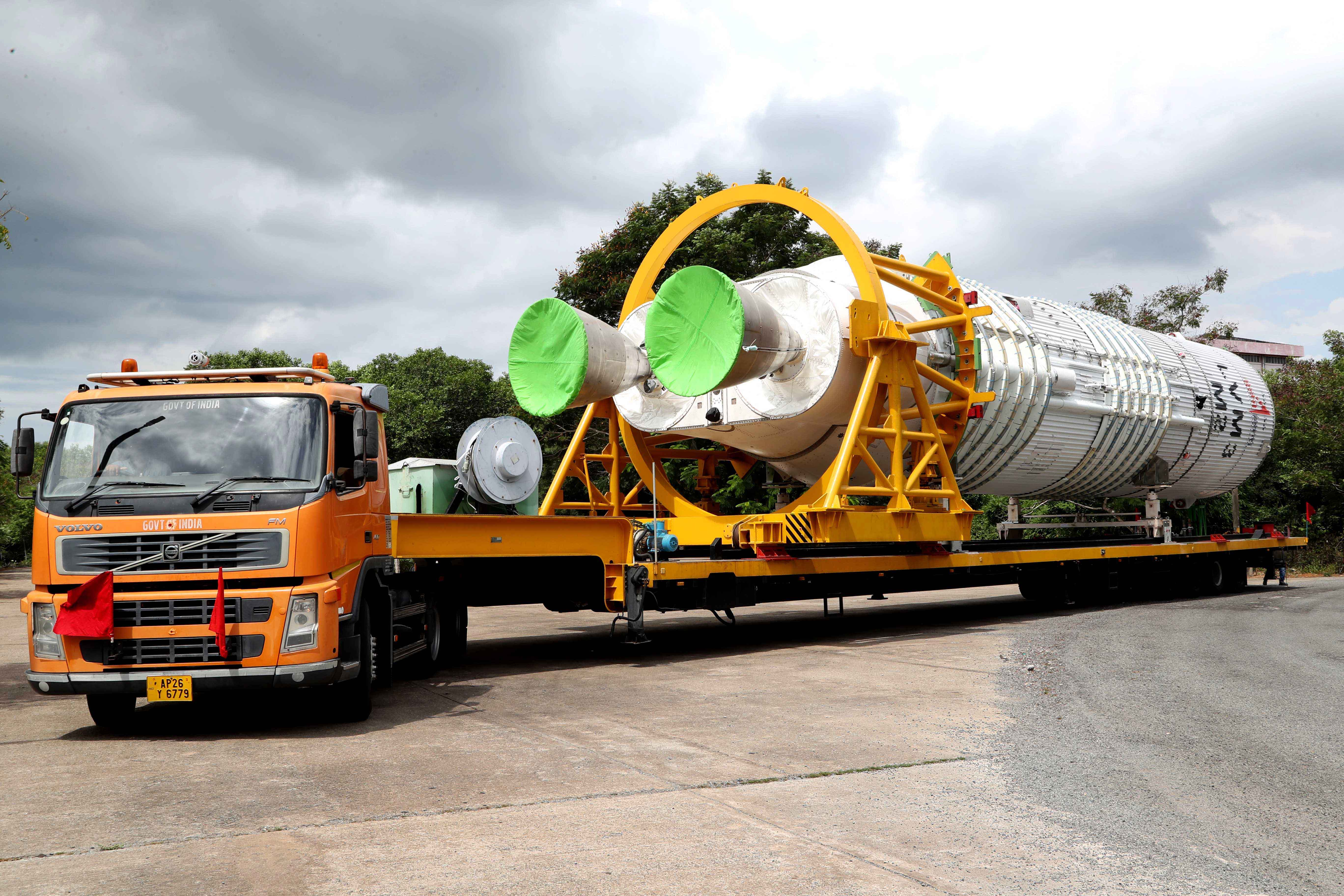

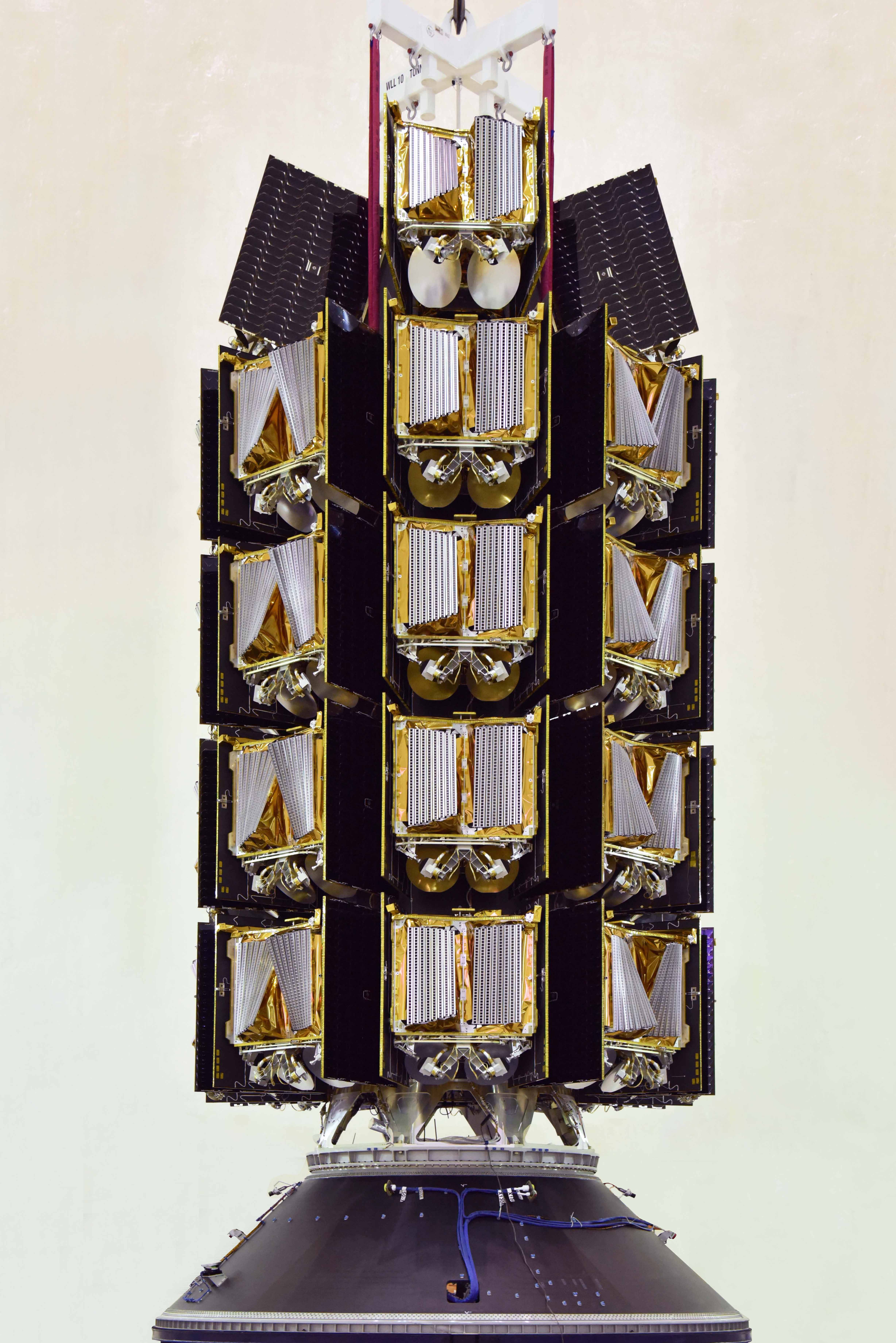

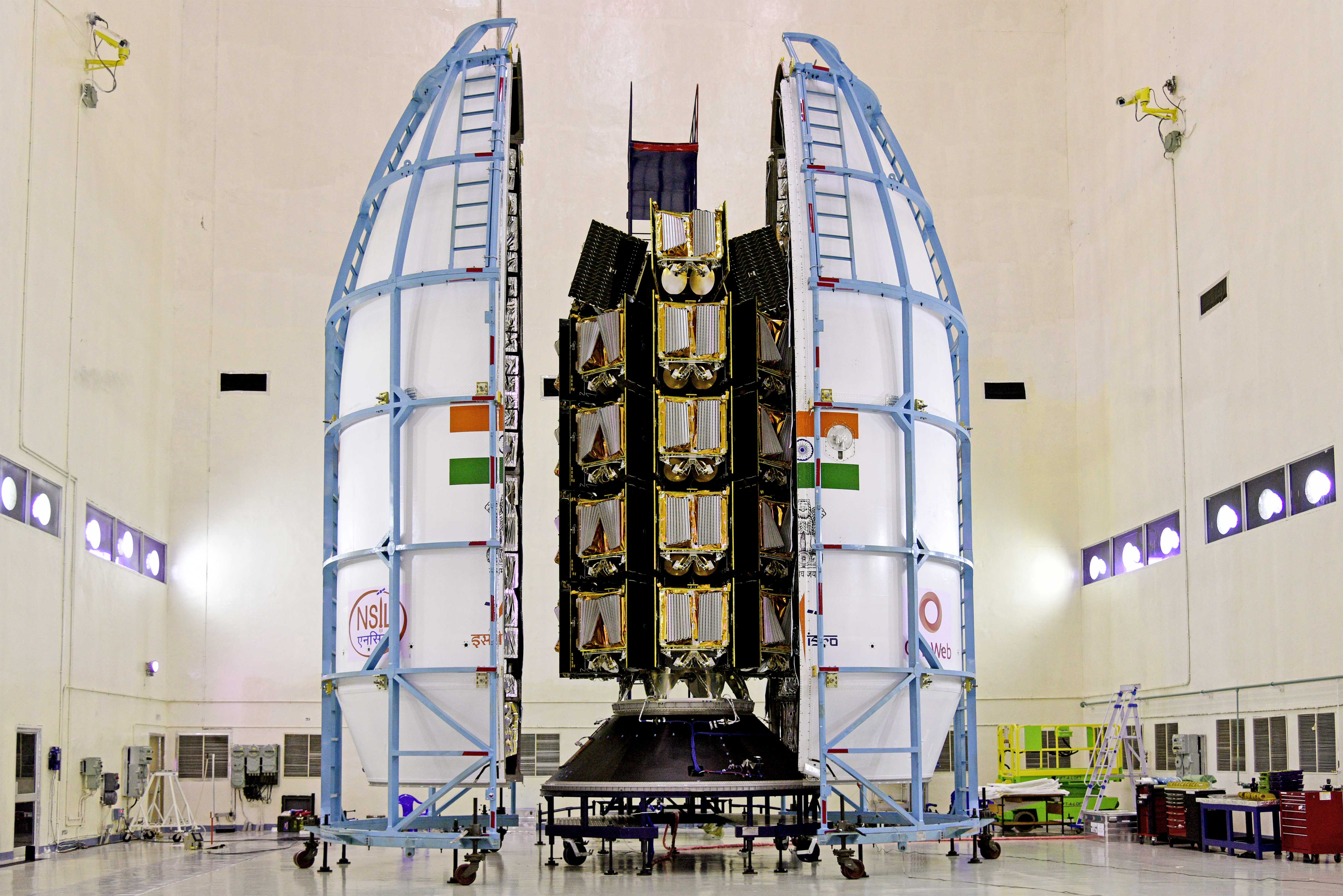

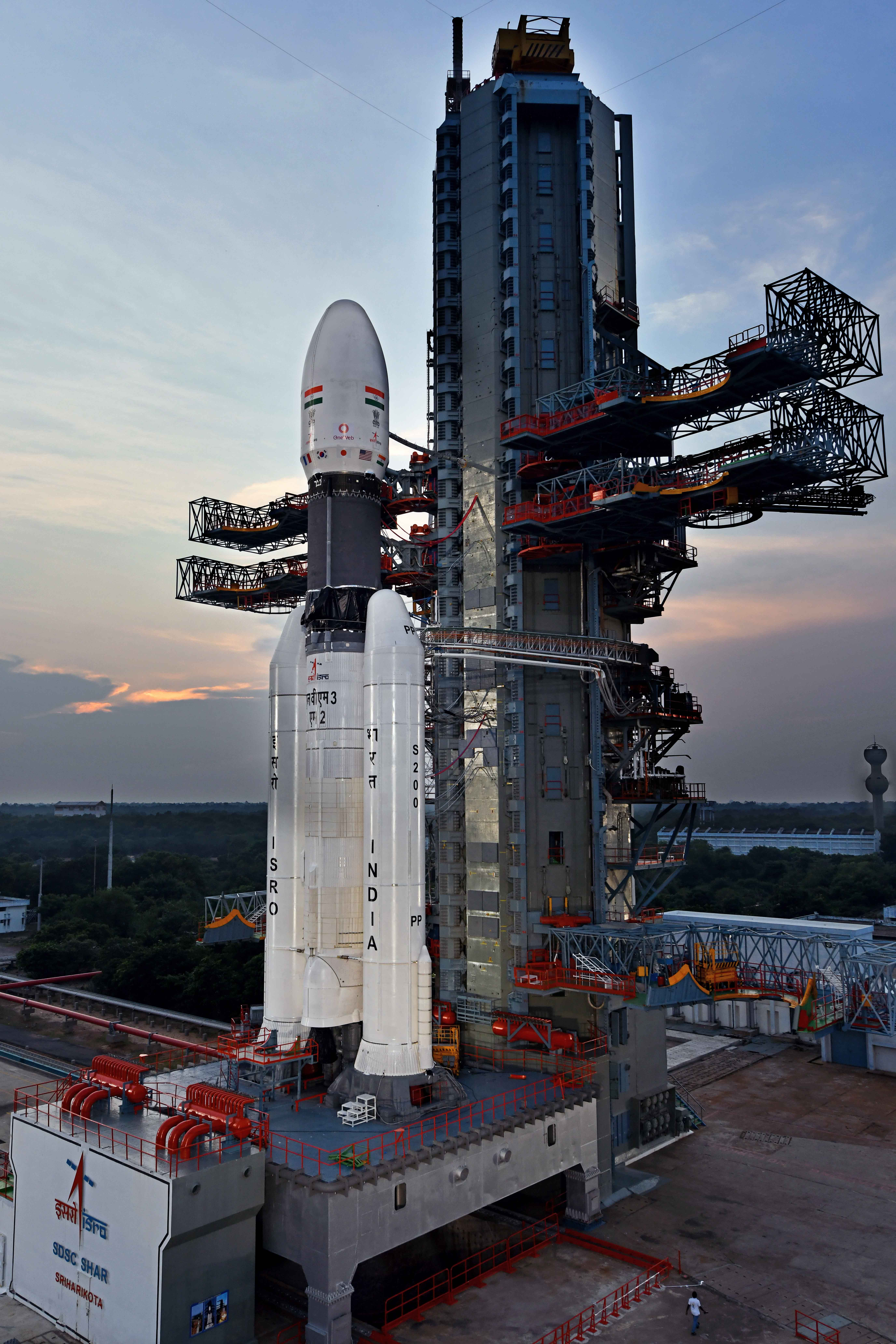

== Mission overview ==
- Mass:
  - Payload weight: 5,796 kg
- Overall height: 43.5 m (143 ft)
- Propellant:
  - Boosters (S200) : HTPB/AP
  - Stage 1 (L110) : UDMH/N_{2}O_{2}
  - Stage 2 (C-25): LOX/ LH2
- Propellant mass:
  - Stage 1: 205,000 kg (452,000 lb)
  - Stage 2: 116,000 kg (256,000 lb)
  - Stage 3: 28,000 kg (62,000 lb)
- Altitude: 601 km
- Inclination: 87.4°

== See also ==
- ISRO
- Starlink
- PSLV
