= Cisne =

Cisne or Cisnes may refer to:

- Cisne Branco, a tall ship of the Brazilian Navy
- Cisne, Illinois, a village in the United States
- Cisne Rivera (born 1996), Ecuadorian model
- Cisnes, a municipality in southern Chile
- Cisnes River, in southern Chile
- Puerto Cisnes, a seaport in southern Chile
- Swan Islands, Falkland Islands (Islas del Cisne)
- Swan Islands, Honduras (Islas del Cisne)

== See also ==
- Cisneros (disambiguation)
