= LVM3-M6 =

2025 Indian satellite launch

- LVM3-M6 during Liftoff

LVM3 launch
- Launch: 24 December 2025, 03:55 UTC
- Operator: ISRO / NSIL
- Pad: SDSC SLP
- Payload: BlueBird-6 (BlueBird Block 2 FM1)

LVM3 launches

LVM3-M6 was the sixth flight and third commercial flight of ISRO's LVM3 rocket and the launch is marked as the 100th Orbital launch by ISRO since the first launch of SLV-3. Launched on 24 December 2025 from the Second Launch Pad at the Satish Dhawan Space Centre (SDSC) in Sriharikota, the mission successfully deployed the AST SpaceMobile's BlueBird-6 (BlueBird Block-2 FM1) communications satellite into low Earth orbit. The launch was delayed by 41 seconds to prevent in-orbit conjuntion with another satellite.

== Mission overview ==
- Mass:
  - Payload weight:6,100 kg (13,400 lb)
- Overall height:
- Propellant:
  - Stage 1 : Composite Solid (Solid Stage)
  - Stage 2 : Earth Storable Liquid (Liquid Stage)
  - Stage 3 : Cryogenic Liquid (Liquid Stage)
- Propellant mass:
  - Stage 1: 205,000 kg (452,000 lb)
  - Stage 2: 116,000 kg (256,000 lb)
  - Stage 3: 28,000 kg (62,000 lb)

== Payload ==
In November 2024, AST SpaceMobile signed launch contracts to launch BlueBird Block 2 Satellites on ISRO's LVM3, SpaceX's Falcon 9 and Blue Origin's New Glenn rocket. The payload of the mission was the BlueBird-6 Communications satellite built by AST SpaceMobile.

BlueBird 6 was the first of AST SpaceMobile's next-generation Block 2 satellites. Its communications array covers nearly 2,400 square feet (223 m²), which the company says is the largest commercial communications array ever deployed in low Earth orbit. The satellite is about 3.5 times larger than BlueBirds 1–5, which were launched in late 2024, and offers a tenfold increase in data capacity. LVM3-M6 lifted off at 10:25 p.m. EST on 23 December 2025 (08:55 a.m. IST on 24 December), and it deployed the satellite about 15.5 minutes after launch at an altitude of about 521 km. ISRO described BlueBird 6 as the heaviest payload the LVM3 had ever carried to low Earth orbit.

On 11 February 2026, AST SpaceMobile announced that BlueBird 6 had successfully unfolded its phased-array antenna in orbit. The company said the antenna's large aperture allows reliable transmission and reception of signals from standard handheld phones and permits more precise beamforming for narrower, more concentrated coverage. AST SpaceMobile described the successful launch as the start of an aggressive deployment campaign aimed at orbiting 45 to 60 satellites by the end of 2026, with launches every one to two months on average.
