= GSAT-29 =

Indian communication satellite

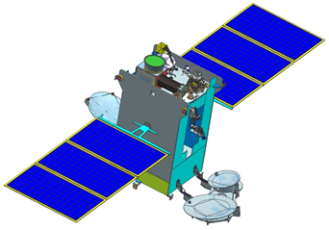
- Render of GSAT-29
- Mission type: Communication
- Operator: ISRO
- COSPAR ID: 2018-089A
- SATCAT no.: 43698
- Mission duration: Planned: 10 years Elapsed: 7 years, 7 months, 9 days

Spacecraft properties
- Bus: I-3K
- Manufacturer: ISRO Satellite Centre; Space Applications Centre
- Launch mass: 3,423 kg (7,546 lb)
- Power: solar arrays, batteries

Start of mission
- Launch date: 14 November 2018; 11:38 UTC
- Launch site: Satish Dhawan SLP
- Contractor: ISRO

Orbital parameters
- Reference system: Geocentric
- Regime: Geostationary
- Slot: 55°E

Transponders
- Band: K_{a}, K_{u}, Q band, V band, and optical communication payload

GSAT-29 is a high-throughput communication satellite developed by the Indian Space Research Organisation (ISRO). The mission aims at providing high-speed bandwidth to Village Resource Centres (VRC) in rural areas. The two Ku and Ka operational payloads will provide communication services to Jammu and Kashmir and Northeast India under Digital India programme. At the time of launch GSAT-29 was the heaviest satellite, weighing 3,423 kg (7,546 lb), that was placed in orbit by an Indian launch vehicle. Approved cost of GSAT-29 is ₹175.63 crore (US$18 million).

== Payloads ==
Apart from its main communication payload in Ka/Ku bands, GSAT-29 hosts few experimental payloads to mature their technology for use in future spacecraft.

- Q band and V band payload: experimental microwave communication payloads
- Optical Communication Technology (OCT) payload: experimental payload for optical communication.
- GEO imaging High Resolution Camera (GHRC): for high resolution imaging from geosynchronous orbit. It has 55 metres (180 ft) resolution and can image in six VNIR spectral bands at ~0.6 sec/frame.

== Launch ==
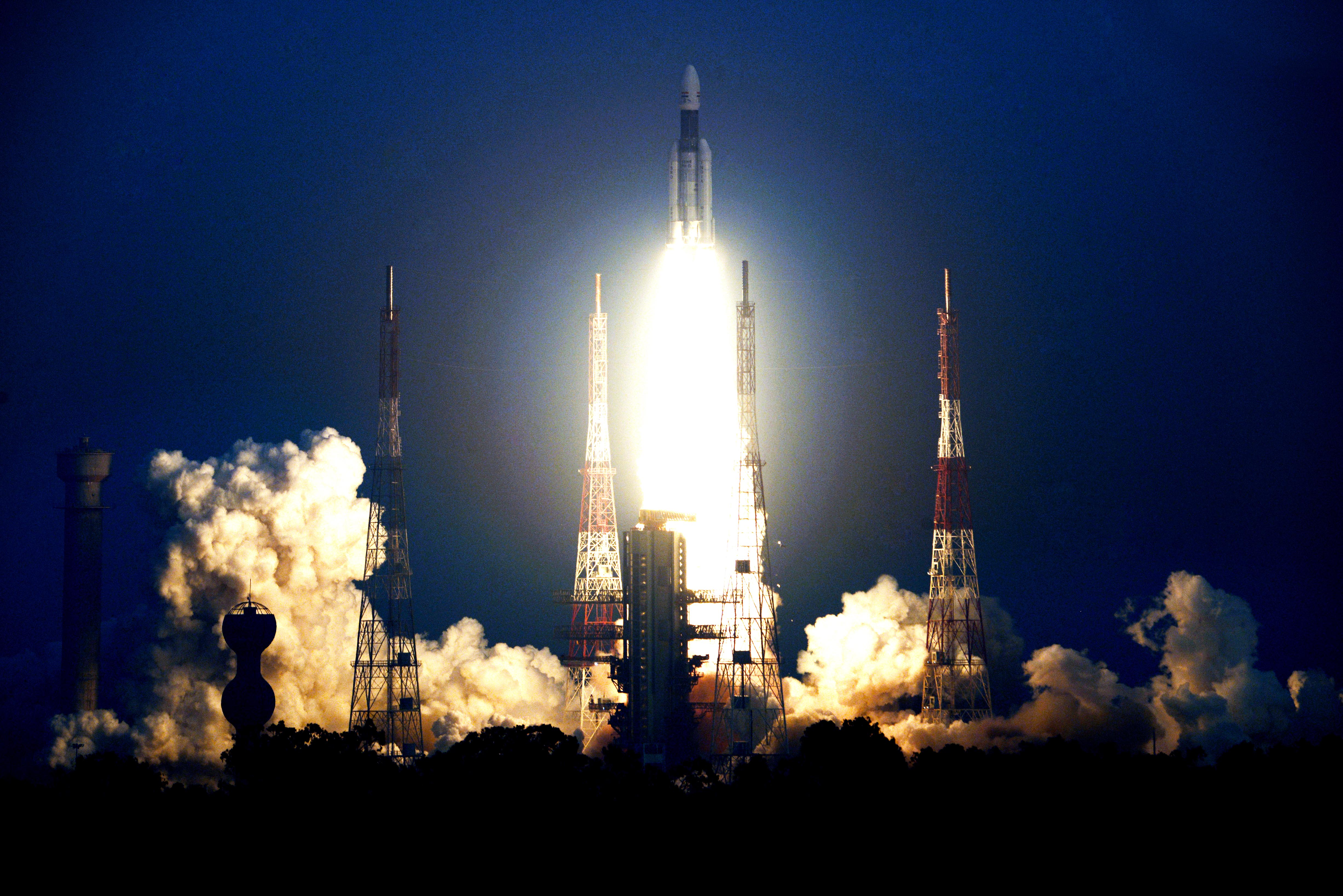
LVM3 D2 lifting off from launchpad, carrying GSAT-29

The satellite was launched on 14 November 2018 through the second developmental flight of LVM3, that placed the GSAT-29 satellite into its planned geosynchronous transfer orbit (GTO) over the equator. It joins the Indian National Satellite System (INSAT) fleet in geostationary orbit.

Op #	Date/ Time (UTC)	LAM burn time	Height achieved		Inclination achieved	Orbital period	References
Op #	Date/ Time (UTC)	LAM burn time	Apogee	Perigee	Inclination achieved	Orbital period	References
1	15 November 2018; 08:34	4875 sec	35,897 km (22,305 mi)	7,642 km (4,749 mi)	8.9°	13 hr	
2	16 November 2018; 10:14	4988 sec	35,837 km (22,268 mi)	32,825 km (20,397 mi)	0.31°	22 hr, 70 min	
3	17 November 2018; 04:25	207 sec	35,875 km (22,292 mi)	35,307 km (21,939 mi)	n/a	24hr	
