= Cisneros =

Cisneros may refer to:

- Cardinal Cisneros (Francisco Jiménez de Cisneros, 1436–1517), Spanish cardinal and statesman
- Cisneros (surname), other people with the surnames Cisneros and Cisnero
- Cisneros, Antioquia, a town in Colombia
- Cisneros, Palencia, a municipality in the autonomous community of Castile and León, Spain
- Cisneros, Valle del Cauca, a village in Buenaventura municipality, Valle del Cauca department, Colombia
- Grupo Cisneros, a Venezuelan conglomerate of media companies
- Cisneros v. CCISD, a court case in the U.S. state of Texas
- Cisneros station, on the Medellín Metro, Colombia
- Spanish cruiser Cardenal Cisneros, a Spanish Navy armored cruiser (1902–1905) named for the cardinal

== See also ==
- Villa Cisneros, former name of Dakhla, Western Sahara
