= AST SpaceMobile =

American satellite manufacturer

AST SpaceMobile, Inc.
- Type: Public
- Traded as: Nasdaq: ASTS (Class A); Russell 1000 component
- Industry: Space
- Founded: 2017; 9 years ago
- Headquarters: Midland, Texas, U.S.
- Key people: Abel Avellan (CEO); Scott Wisniewski (President); Andrew Johnson (CFO and CLO); Dr. Huiwen Yao (CTO); Chris Ivory (CCO); Shanti Gupta (COO)
- Services: Space-based cellular connectivity
- Revenue: ▲US$71 million (2025)
- Operating income: ▼US$−288 million (2025)
- Net income: ▲US$−461 million (2025)
- Total assets: ▲US$5,014 million (2025)
- Total equity: ▲US$2,392 million (2025)
- Number of employees: 578 (2024)
- Website: ast-science.com
- Footnotes; Financials as of December 31, 2025. References

AST SpaceMobile, Inc. is a publicly traded satellite designer and manufacturer based in Midland, Texas, United States. The company is building the SpaceMobile satellite constellation, a space-based cellular broadband network designed to connect directly to standard, unmodified smartphones. The network is intended to deliver 4G and 5G broadband coverage globally, particularly in remote and underserved regions.

Its BlueWalker 3 prototype and BlueBird commercial satellites are reported as among the largest commercial communications arrays in low Earth orbit after their respective launches and unfoldings in 2022 and 2024. The company's 2023 demonstrations included voice and data connections between standard smartphones and its BlueWalker 3 satellite.

== History ==
AST SpaceMobile was founded in May 2017 by Abel Avellan as AST & Science LLC. Avellan remains the chairman and chief executive officer of the company. Originally from Venezuela, Avellan is a United States citizen who previously worked for Swedish telecommunications conglomerate Ericsson. In 1999, Avellan founded Emerging Markets Communications, a satellite-based communications services provider to maritime and other mobility markets, which was acquired in 2016 for US$550 million. He also serves as a Commissioner of the UN Broadband Commission for Sustainable Development.

AST & Science purchased a controlling interest in NanoAvionics, a Lithuanian satellite manufacturing company, on March 6, 2018.

In March 2020, AST & Science LLC announced a Series B investment round, led by Vodafone and Rakuten, that raised $110 million for the company. Samsung Next, American Tower, and Cisneros also participated.

New Providence's first special-purpose acquisition company (SPAC) announced in April 2021 that its shareholders had approved a proposal to form AST SpaceMobile in a business combination with AST & Science LLC. AST SpaceMobile began to trade on the Nasdaq in the week after that announcement. New Providence had raised $462 million through an initial public offering (IPO) and a private investment in public equity (PIPE) to fully fund the development and first phase of its satellite constellation.

AST SpaceMobile started generating revenue through a U.S. Government contract in 2024. However, the company does not expect to begin generating substantial revenue through mobile network operators like AT&T and Verizon until the company's BlueBird 1-5 satellites are fully operational. The mobile network operators with whom the company has agreements and understandings collectively serve over 2.8 billion existing subscribers.

In July 2022, Nokia announced that it had won a five-year 4G and 5G deal from AST SpaceMobile.

AST SpaceMobile sold its majority ownership stake in NanoAvionics to Kongsberg Defence & Aerospace in September 2022.

In January 2024, AST SpaceMobile announced a new partnership with Google and AT&T to collaborate on product development, testing, and implementation plans for bringing satellite connectivity to Android smartphones.

In May 2024, the company announced a $100 million partnership with Verizon to expand coverage to more remote parts of the United States, beyond the reach of a land-based network.

On August 21, 2024, after the company confirmed its first commercial satellite launch in early September, AST SpaceMobile stock price jumped to $38.60 per share, or around 1,800% compared to record lows of $1.97 per share on April 2, 2024. As a result, the company's market cap exceeded $8 billion in August 2024. On December 9, 2024, AST SpaceMobile announced a commercial contract to provide space-based cellular broadband connectivity to Vodafone in Europe and Africa, as well as Vodafone's partners, through 2034; making a first test mobile video call with a standard smartphone the following month.

In December 2024, SpaceNews named AST SpaceMobile "Emerging Space Company of the Year" at its annual Icon Awards.

As of Q2 2025, AST SpaceMobile has raised over US$2 billion.

Time Magazine included the company's BlueBird satellite design in its Best Inventions list in 2025, and Fast Company recognized CEO Abel Avellan among its Visionaries of the Year.

In mid-October 2025, AST SpaceMobile shipped its first next-generation BlueBird Block 2 satellite, FM1 (designated BlueBird-6), to India for launch preparations.

Following delivery, AST SpaceMobile prepared FM1 for a target launch date in December 2025.

On October 29, 2025, AST SpaceMobile announced a 10-year agreement with stc group that includes a $175 million prepayment commitment to support direct-to-device services in Saudi Arabia and selected regional markets.

ISRO's LVM3 successfully launched the BlueBird Block-2 satellite into low Earth orbit on December 24, 2025, lifting off from Sriharikota at 8:55 a.m. and deploying the satellite 15 minutes later.

On November 6, 2026, AST SpaceMobile announced plans to develop partially reusable medium-lift launch vehicle, called Blacklift, in collaboration with Firefly Aerospace. It would be capable of carrying up to 5 BlueBird satellites to low earth orbit (LEO), with operations expected to start in late 2028.

== BlueWalker satellites ==
=== BlueWalker 1 ===
BlueWalker 1, the first satellite of AST & Science LLC, was launched on April 1, 2019, from the Satish Dhawan Space Centre in India on the 47th mission of the Indian Polar Satellite Launch Vehicle (PSLV-C45). Lithuanian smallsat company NanoAvionics built BlueWalker 1. The satellite decayed from orbit on November 29, 2023.

=== BlueWalker 3 ===
In July 2021, AST SpaceMobile announced an agreement with SpaceX to launch its second satellite, BlueWalker 3. It successfully launched on September 10, 2022, on a SpaceX Falcon 9 Block 5 rocket from Kennedy Space Center Launch Complex 39A. The 693-square-foot (64 m^{2}) antenna array of BlueWalker 3 was successfully unfolded to full deployment on November 10, 2022. AST SpaceMobile expects BlueWalker 3 to have a field of view of over 300,000 square miles on Earth. As of November 2022, BlueWalker 3 maintains low Earth orbit at an altitude between approximately 508 and 527 km (316 and 327 mi).

On April 25, 2023, AST SpaceMobile made the world's first space-based two-way telephone call with unmodified smartphones (a Samsung Galaxy S22 and an Apple iPhone) using the BlueWalker 3 satellite. This initial call was made from Midland, Texas to Japan using an AT&T 2G cellular frequency spectrum. The company also made the first 4G and 5G connectivity from a satellite in space directly to unmodified smartphones using the prototype satellite, achieving download rates as high as 21 Mbit/s. The company used this connectivity to make the first-ever space-based 5G voice calls, when AST SpaceMobile staff in Hawaii used unmodified Samsung Galaxy S22 handsets connected directly to BlueWalker 3 to call a Vodafone engineer (José Guevara) in Madrid, Spain. In 2023, the company conducted a test which resulted in the first successful video call via space between everyday smartphones.

=== List of BlueWalker satellites ===
Mission	Satellite(s)	Launch date	Launch vehicle	Launch site	Notes
BlueWalker 1	BlueWalker 1	April 1, 2019	PSLV	Satish Dhawan Space Centre	Technology demonstrator satellite; early prototype for space-based cellular communications.
BlueWalker 3	BlueWalker 3	September 10, 2022	Falcon 9	Cape Canaveral Space Force Station	Large prototype satellite (~64 m² array) used to test direct-to-device connectivity from space.

== BlueBird satellites ==
=== BlueBirds 1–5 ===
In March 2022, AST SpaceMobile announced a multi-launch contract with SpaceX to launch its first BlueBird operational satellite. AST SpaceMobile has stated that it plans to produce up to six BlueBird satellites per month at two manufacturing sites in Midland, Texas. The company attributed delays in the deployment schedule of its first operational Block 1 BlueBird satellites to supply chain issues and price increases. On September 12, 2024, the company launched all five satellites with its BlueBird 1–5 mission aboard a SpaceX Falcon 9 rocket. Hundreds of AST SpaceMobile's retail investors attended the mission's launch from Cape Canaveral, Florida. On October 4, 2024, Avellan announced the first of the mission's Block 1 satellites had unfolded “ahead of schedule”, By October 25, the company stated all five satellites had completely unfolded.

=== BlueBird 6 ===
On November 14, 2024, AST SpaceMobile announced a launch campaign for its next-generation Block 2 BlueBird satellites. The company revealed plans to utilize multiple launch providers, including Blue Origin's forthcoming New Glenn rocket, SpaceX's launch vehicles, and those operated by ISRO. This initiative aims to deploy up to 60 Block 2 BlueBird satellites, each equipped with a communication array spanning approximately 2,400 square feet (223 square meters). These satellites are designed to achieve data transmission speeds of up to 120 Mbit/s, enabling voice, data, and video communication capabilities for end users.

AST SpaceMobile's next-generation Block 2 BlueBird satellites are more than three times larger than the previous Block 1 BlueBirds with 10 times the data capacity.

On December 23, 2025, BlueBird 6 was successfully launched into orbit by India's ISRO on a LVM3 rocket from the Satish Dhawan Space Centre with the mission designation LVM3-M6. According to ISRO, BlueBird 6, weighing in at 6,100 kilograms, was the heaviest payload that the LVM3 has ever launched into LEO.

=== BlueBird 7 ===
BlueBird 7 was a next-generation communications satellite developed by AST SpaceMobile. It was launched on April 19, 2026 aboard a New Glenn rocket into low Earth orbit. The satellite was part of the company's Block 2 BlueBird series and was designed to support the company's space-based cellular broadband network providing direct-to-device connectivity (4G/5G) to standard smartphones. BlueBird 7 was identical in design to BlueBird 6. BlueBirds 6 and 7 were the only Block 2 satellites featuring aluminum controlsat bodies. Insufficient thrust from one of the second stage engines is suspected to have been the cause for the satellite being placed into an elliptical 265 x 400km orbit. The satellite was de-orbited on April 20. The launch vehicle was grounded by the FAA.

=== List of BlueBird satellites ===
Mission	Satellite(s)	Launch date	Launch vehicle	Launch site	Notes
BlueBird 1–5	5 × Block 1	September 12, 2024	Falcon 9	Cape Canaveral Space Force Station	First batch of commercial satellites; launched together into LEO.
BlueBird 6	1 × Block 2	December 23, 2025	LVM3	Satish Dhawan Space Centre	First Block 2 satellite; significantly larger (~2,400 sq ft array).
BlueBird 7	1 × Block 2	April 19, 2026	New Glenn	Cape Canaveral Space Force Station	Second Block 2 satellite; released below operational altitude and will be deorbited.
BlueBird 8–10	3 × Block 2	June 17, 2026	Falcon 9	Cape Canaveral Space Force Station	Three additional Block 2 satellites.
BlueBird 11–13	3 × Block 2	August 5, 2026	Falcon 9	Cape Canaveral Space Force Station	Three additional Block 2 satellites.

== Licenses ==
In April 2020, AST & Science LLC petitioned the Federal Communications Commission for permission to operate a constellation of 243 communications satellites in 16 orbital planes at altitudes between 725 and 740 km (450 and 460 mi).

In October 2020, NASA filed a letter with the FCC during the public-comment period related to this petition to express concerns about the risk of collisions between the SpaceMobile satellite constellation and the A-train satellite constellation, due to the proposed orbital altitude for SpaceMobile as well as the size and scale of the SpaceMobile project. In November 2020, NASA submitted a second letter to the FCC to revise its original stance as a result of AST SpaceMobile's demonstrated interest in collaborating with NASA to mitigate risks. In its second letter, NASA stated that technical concerns "need not preclude the issuance of the requested license" and that NASA had no concern with the license being granted. Three United States Senators and one United States Congressman also filed letters with the FCC in support of SpaceMobile.

United States wireless provider AT&T has partnered with AST SpaceMobile in a joint effort to provide satellite-based wireless service to remote areas of its coverage area. AT&T filed a letter with the FCC in support of the petition for a license to operate in the United States, while AT&T's major competitors T-Mobile and Verizon initially asked the FCC to deny such a license. In May 2024, it was announced that Verizon had become an investor and strategic partner of AST SpaceMobile. AST SpaceMobile later revealed it would use “a segment” of both AT&T and Verizon's 850 MHz spectrum to support 100% geographic coverage within the United States.

In May 2022, the FCC granted AST SpaceMobile an experimental license to connect to the BlueWalker 3 satellite. In August 2024, the FCC authorized the company to launch and operate the frequencies required to support the initial BlueBird 1–5 satellite mission, including gateway, feeder link, and telemetry, tracking, and control operations. As of November 2024, the FCC has not yet decided if AST SpaceMobile can operate in terrestrial cellular frequencies and enable the company to provide commercial satellite-to-cell services.

In January 2025, the FCC granted AST SpaceMobile Special Temporary Authority to test its services with BlueBirds 1–5 using AT&T and Verizon spectrum in the U.S., followed by authorization in April 2025 to test on Band 14 spectrum for FirstNet, supporting first responder and public safety communications.

On August 29, 2025, the FCC authorized AST SpaceMobile to deploy an additional 20 satellites and to perform telemetry, tracking, and command (TT&C) operations.

On June 13, 2025, AST SpaceMobile was granted long-term access to 45 MHz of premium lower mid-band spectrum in the U.S. and Canada, including 40 MHz of L-Band Mobile Satellite Service spectrum and 5 MHz in the 1670–1675 MHz band. This agreement secures spectrum access for up to 80 years and is part of ongoing arrangements with spectrum holders to enable commercial satellite-to-cellular service.

== Impact on astronomy ==
BW3 imaged from the ground by M. Tzukran

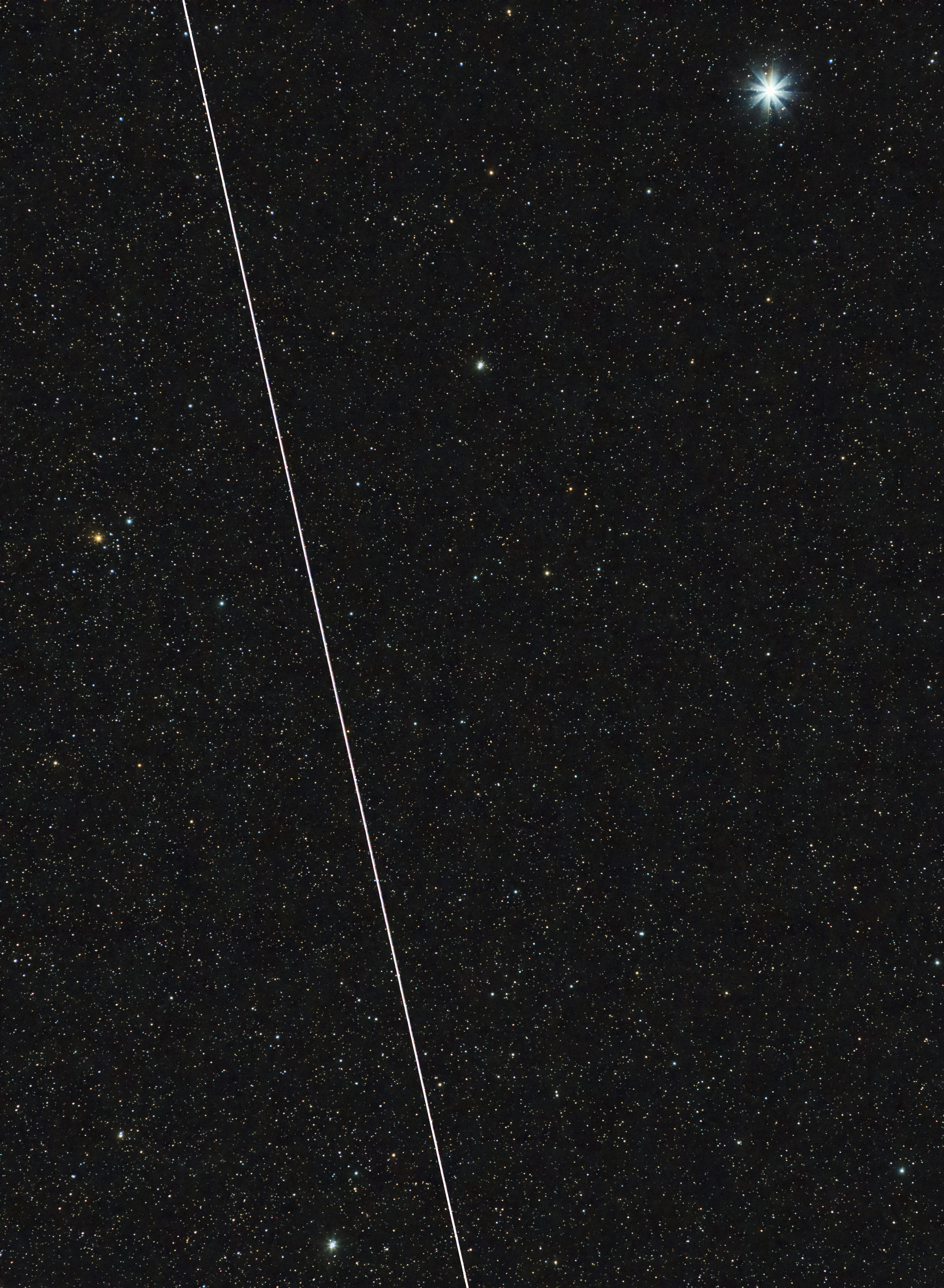
Trail of BlueWalker 3 crossing the night sky, taken in Tucson, Arizona, on November 20, 2022

The SpaceMobile constellation has drawn criticism for its potential contribution to light pollution in the night sky, as well as radio-frequency interference with certain telescopes that operate outside of the visible light spectrum.

Observations of BlueWalker 3 were obtained after it unfolded into a large flat-panel shape in November 2022. The measurements indicate that the fully deployed satellite is very bright and usually approaches first magnitude when it is near the zenith.

Follow-up observations revealed three deep but temporary periods of reduced brightness. The dimming was attributed to a change in the orientation of the flat-panel needed in order to boost solar power generation. This finding indicated that the satellite operator can reduce the luminosity of their constellation and mitigate its adverse impact on astronomy by making a small adjustment to the spacecraft orientation.

Additional criticism was focused on the proliferation of similar satellites being developed by AST SpaceMobile which – as a group – could have a deleterious impact to the science of astronomy. Notes the New York Times, "they create bright trails and an ambient glow in the sky that can destroy astronomical images and obscure fainter celestial objects that would otherwise be visible to the naked eye."

In response to these concerns, AST SpaceMobile entered into a formal coordination agreement with the National Science Foundation to address potential impacts on ground-based astronomy. The company has committed to implementing several mitigation measures, including the development of advanced surface coatings designed to reduce sunlight reflection, strategic satellite orientation adjustments during critical observation periods, and provision of high-precision orbital data to observatories at accelerated refresh rates to enable avoidance scheduling. In contrast to satellite constellations that plan to deploy thousands of spacecraft, AST SpaceMobile intends to provide global coverage using approximately 90 satellites equipped with large antenna arrays.

=== Radio frequency coordination and interference mitigation ===
AST SpaceMobile submitted a modification application to the FCC Space Bureau on June 20, 2025, seeking authority to use the 430–440 MHz band for satellite telemetry, tracking, and command. This filing prompted significant opposition from the amateur radio community, with the ARRL and several IARU member societies lodging objections and the proceeding drawing well over 2,400 public submissions.

In response to these concerns, AST SpaceMobile revised its frequency usage plans. It withdrew an earlier proposal to use the 400–410 MHz band for TT&C and instead requested restricted access to the 430–440 MHz band. The revised request limited use to non-routine TT&C operations during launch and early orbit phase (LEOP) or emergency situations, and only when other frequencies are unavailable.

AST SpaceMobile received a limited grant from the Bureau on August 29, 2025, that permits use of 430–440 MHz for TT&C only during emergencies, for periods not exceeding 24 hours, and only for a defined set of additional satellites.

AST SpaceMobile is working with the National Science Foundation and the National Radio Astronomy Observatory to characterize potential effects on radio astronomy and to ensure satellite downlinks and gateways do not cause harmful interference, including through field tests and coordination.

=== Space safety and orbital debris mitigation ===
In December 2022, AST SpaceMobile entered into a Space Act Agreement with NASA to support information-sharing and conjunction assessment related to its test satellites. Subsequently, the U.S. FCC accepted the company's Orbital Debris Assessment Report as part of its licensing proceedings.

== See also ==
- Beamforming
- Phased array
- Satellite internet constellation
