= Cisneros, Valle del Cauca =

Cisneros
- Populated center
- Location in Valle del Cauca Department and Colombia Cisneros (Colombia)
- Coordinates: 3°46′51.5″N 76°45′33.0″W
- Country: Colombia
- Department: Valle del Cauca
- Municipality: Buenaventura municipality
- Elevation: 1,050 ft (320 m)

Population (2018)
  - Total: 419
- Time zone: UTC-5 (Colombia Standard Time)

Cisneros is a populated center of Colombia in Buenaventura Municipality, Valle del Cauca Department in Colombia. It is located at the border between Buenaventura and Dagua municipalities.

== Climate ==
Cisneros has a tropical rainforest climate (Af) with heavy rainfall year-round.

Climate data for Cisneros
Month	Jan	Feb	Mar	Apr	May	Jun	Jul	Aug	Sep	Oct	Nov	Dec	Year
Mean daily maximum °C (°F)	30.0 (86.0)	30.3 (86.5)	30.3 (86.5)	30.0 (86.0)	29.8 (85.6)	29.9 (85.8)	30.4 (86.7)	30.3 (86.5)	30.2 (86.4)	29.3 (84.7)	29.0 (84.2)	28.4 (83.1)	29.8 (85.7)
Daily mean °C (°F)	25.2 (77.4)	25.5 (77.9)	25.5 (77.9)	25.4 (77.7)	25.3 (77.5)	25.2 (77.4)	25.4 (77.7)	25.3 (77.5)	25.3 (77.5)	24.8 (76.6)	24.7 (76.5)	24.3 (75.7)	25.2 (77.3)
Mean daily minimum °C (°F)	20.4 (68.7)	20.7 (69.3)	20.8 (69.4)	20.9 (69.6)	20.9 (69.6)	20.6 (69.1)	20.4 (68.7)	20.4 (68.7)	20.4 (68.7)	20.3 (68.5)	20.4 (68.7)	20.3 (68.5)	20.5 (69.0)
Average rainfall mm (inches)	144 (5.7)	142 (5.6)	158 (6.2)	231 (9.1)	261 (10.3)	189 (7.4)	161 (6.3)	190 (7.5)	241 (9.5)	348 (13.7)	313 (12.3)	212 (8.3)	2,590 (101.9)
Source: Climate-Data.org
