= GSAT-19 =

Indian communications satellite

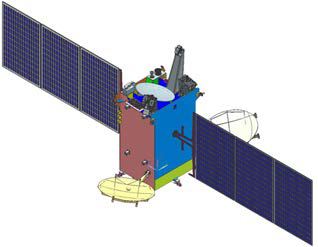
- Render of GSAT-19
- Mission type: Communications
- Operator: INSAT
- COSPAR ID: 2017-031A
- SATCAT no.: 42747
- Website: GSAT-19
- Mission duration: Planned: 10 years Elapsed: 7 years, 9 months, 21 days

Spacecraft properties
- Bus: I-3K
- Manufacturer: ISRO Satellite Centre; Space Applications Centre
- Launch mass: 3,136 kg (6,914 lb)
- Dry mass: 1,394 kg (3,073 lb)
- Dimensions: 2.0 × 1.77 × 3.1 m (6.6 × 5.8 × 10.2 ft)
- Power: 4,500 watts

Start of mission
- Launch date: 5 June 2017, 11:58 UTC
- Rocket: LVM3-D1
- Launch site: Satish Dhawan SLP
- Contractor: ISRO

Orbital parameters
- Reference system: Geocentric
- Regime: Geostationary
- Longitude: 48° E
- Perigee altitude: 35,470 km (22,040 mi)
- Apogee altitude: 35,869 km (22,288 mi)
- Inclination: 0.101 deg
- Period: 23 hr, 50 min, 10 sec
- Epoch: 10 June 2017, 02:29 UTC

Transponders
- Band: 4 × K_{u}/K_{a} forward links; 4 × K_{u}/K_{a} return links
- Coverage area: India

GSAT-19 is an Indian communications satellite launched by the Indian Space Research Organisation aboard an LVM3 on 5 June 2017.

== Satellite and payloads ==
The satellite will act as a testbed for the modular I-6K satellite bus, carrying experimental technologies such as ion thrusters for manoeuvring and stabilisation, active thermal control using thermal radiators, a miniaturised inertial reference unit, indigenously produced lithium-ion batteries, and C-band traveling-wave-tube amplifiers.

Rather than traditional transponders, GSAT-19 carries four K_{u}/K_{a}-band forward link beams and four K_{u}/K_{a}-band return link beams, providing much higher data throughput than India's previous communications satellites. It additionally carries a Geostationary Radiation Spectrometer (GRASP) payload, which will "monitor and study the nature of charged particles and the influence of space radiation on satellites and their electronic components".

== Orbit raising and station keeping ==
The satellite was launched aboard the LVM3-D1 rocket in the evening of 5 June 2017 to a geostationary transfer orbit perigee of 180 km (112 mi). This was followed by a series of orbit raising operations (using an on-board LAM and chemical thrusters) to place the satellite in the intended geostationary orbital slot.

Op #	Date/ Time (UTC)	LAM burn time	Height achieved		Inclination achieved	Orbital period	References
Op #	Date/ Time (UTC)	LAM burn time	Apogee	Perigee	Inclination achieved	Orbital period	References
1	6 June 2017; 08:33	116 s	35,938 km (22,331 mi)	172.77 km (107.35 mi)	21.56°	10 h, 30 min	
2	7 June 2017; 10:14	5538 s	35,840 km (22,270 mi)	10,287 km (6,392 mi)	7.02°	13 h, 58 min	
3	9 June 2017; 04:25	3469 s	35,875 km (22,292 mi)	30,208 km (18,770 mi)	0.793°	21 h, 38 min	
4	10 June 2017; 02:29	488 s	35,869 km (22,288 mi)	35,470 km (22,040 mi)	0.101°	23 h, 50 min, 10 s	
