= Dinitrogen dioxide =

Identifiers
CAS Number	linear: 16824-89-8; cyclic: 13354-65-9; bicyclic: 158362-70-0
3D model (JSmol)	linear: Interactive image; cyclic: Interactive image; bicyclic: Interactive image
ChEBI	linear: CHEBI:29797
ChemSpider	linear: 5256996; cyclic: 29334740; bicyclic: 57448491
Gmelin Reference	1035
PubChem CID	linear: 6857661
UNII	P6TX5AE4Q8
- InChI: InChI=1S/N2O2/c3-1-2-4 Key: AZLYZRGJCVQKKK-UHFFFAOYSA-N
- SMILES: linear: N(=O)N=O; cyclic: O1N=NO1; bicyclic: O1N2N1O2

Properties
Chemical formula	N_{2}O_{2}
Molar mass	60.012 g·mol^{−1}
- Except where otherwise noted, data are given for materials in their standard state (at 25 °C [77 °F], 100 kPa). Infobox references

Dinitrogen dioxide is an inorganic compound having molecular formula N_{2}O_{2}. Many structural isomers are possible. The covalent bonding pattern O=N–N=O (a non-cyclic dimer of nitric oxide (NO)) is predicted to be the most stable isomer based on ab initio calculations and is the only one that has been experimentally produced. In the solid form, the molecules have C_{2v} symmetry: the entire structure is planar, with the two oxygen atoms cis across the N–N bond. The O–N distance is 1.15 Å, the N–N distance is 2.33 Å, and the O=N–N angle is 95°.

It is an intermediate in the high-pressure disproportionation of nitric oxide:

2NO ⇌ N_{2}O_{2}
N_{2}O_{2} + NO → N_{2}O + NO_{2}
