= Greg Wyler =

American tech entrepreneur

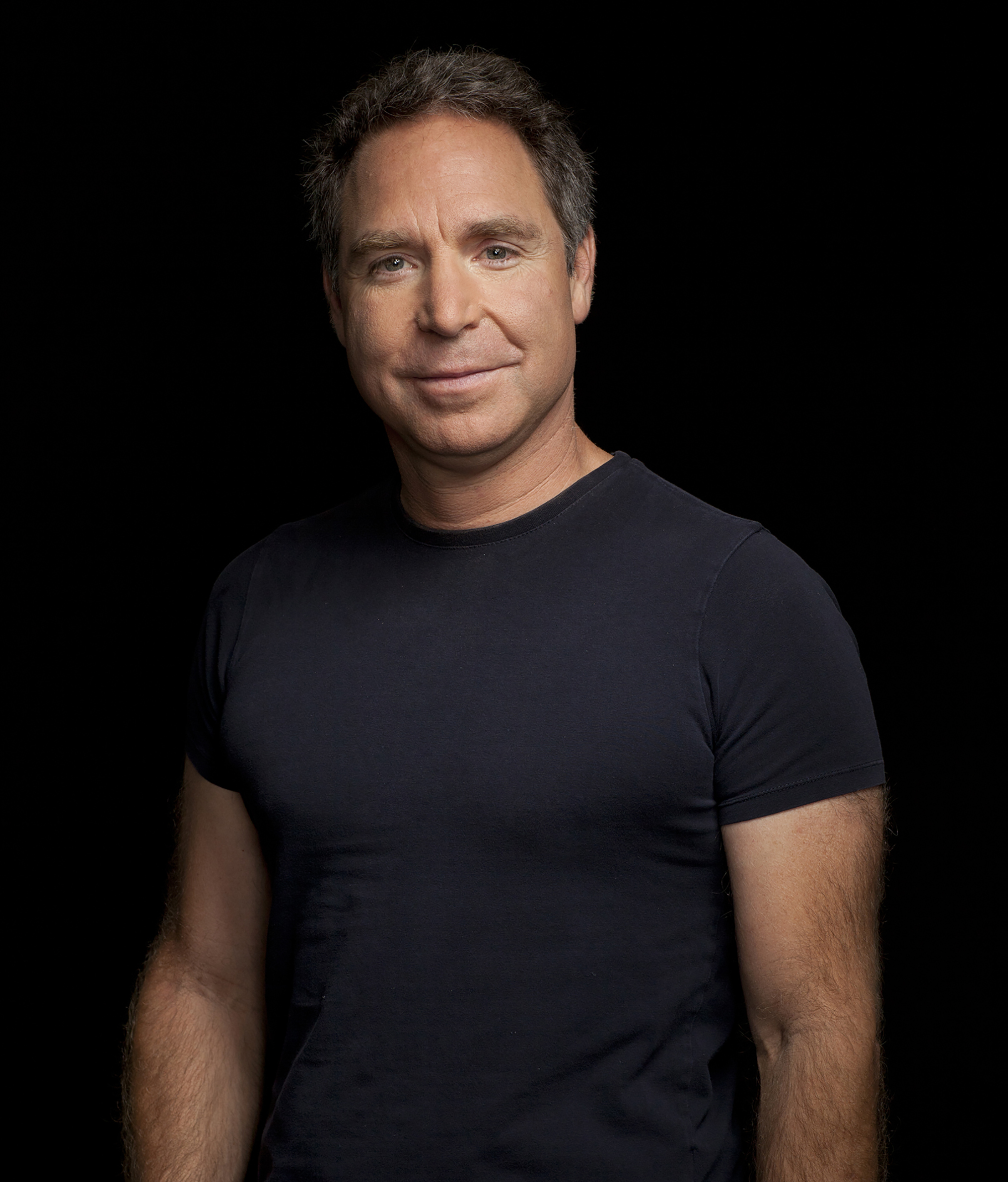
- Greg Wyler in 2015

Gregory Thane Wyler is an American tech entrepreneur, engineer, and inventor. He was the founder and executive chairman of OneWeb, and the founder of O3b Networks. Wyler is presently the founder of E-Space.

== Business ventures ==
In 2003, Wyler's company Terracom bought 99% of Rwandatel, Rwanda's national telecommunications company, for $20 million, and was contracted to connect 300 schools to the Internet. Rwandan officials later said only a handful of schools had been connected, and after disputes over the company's licence obligations the government bought the company back in 2007.

In 2007, Wyler founded O3b Networks, Ltd., which raised about $1.3 billion to build a medium Earth orbit satellite constellation providing backhaul for telecom operators in remote markets. By late 2015, O3b had launched 12 satellites.

In 2012, Wyler founded OneWeb with the mission of "enabling Internet access for everyone".

On 1 August 2016, satellite operator SES S.A. completed the acquisition of O3b Networks.

In March 2020, OneWeb entered Chapter 11 bankruptcy after failing to raise enough capital to complete the build and deployment of its satellite constellation. OneWeb exited bankruptcy with new investment, but Wyler was no longer involved with the company.

Wyler founded satellite communications company E-Space in 2021, to create a network of satellites providing services targeting governments and businesses.

== Awards and recognition ==
In 2015, Wyler received the Arthur C. Clarke Foundation's Innovator award for "pioneering new approaches to satellite communications". In August 2017, FierceWireless readers voted him the top Rising Star in wireless, and in December 2017 he won the publication's "Most Powerful Person in Telecom" reader poll.
