= E-Space =

Satellite communications company

- Company type: Private
- Industry: Satellite constellation
- Founded: 2022
- Founder: Greg Wyler
- Headquarters: Toulouse, France and Arlington, Texas
- Key people: Greg Wyler
- Products: Satellites
- Website: www.e-space.com

E-Space is a satellite communications company. Created by Greg Wyler, E-Space satellites are designed to form a "constellation" of small satellites designed to resist fragmenting if struck in orbit.

The company has said that its satellites have also been designed to clean up small pieces of orbital debris, as well as to provide communications services to governments and businesses.

It launched its first three demonstration satellites in May 2022.

== History ==
E-Space was publicly launched in 2022 by satellite and space entrepreneur Greg Wyler, who previously founded OneWeb and O3b Networks. Based both in France and the United States, the company was created to form a network of inexpensive, small satellites to provide services to governments and businesses.

At launch, it raised $50 million from Prime Movers Lab and other investors.

In February 2022, Wyler told the Financial Times that E-Space would launch up to 100,000 satellites in orbit within a decade, and that their satellites were the "first to be designed to clean space." He said that E-Space technology enables their satellites to collect orbital debris. He also said E-Space satellites are designed to be resilient to a chain reaction of orbital collisions known as a Kessler event.

E-Space's first three demonstration satellites were launched via Rocket Lab launch vehicles in May 2022. As of August 2022, the company had filed for 300,000 satellites through the country of Rwanda. In November of that same year E-Space also became one of the first companies in the world to be listed in the Kingdom of Saudi Arabia's official satellite registry, thus providing legal permission for E-Space to provide land communications traffic in that country.

In December 2022, E-Space announced its first acquisition with the purchase of CommAgility, a unit of the publicly traded company Wireless Telecom Group that specializes in cellular and satellite signal management.

== Technologies ==
E-Space satellites are smaller than most other commercial satellites, and are designed to "crumple" if struck in space. The satellites are also designed to collect space debris, and to automatically deorbit at the end of their lifespans to prevent leaving additional debris.
