= Altius Space Machines =

American aerospace company

Coordinates: 39.9223199589016°N 105.1025781309834°W

Altius Space Machines Inc.
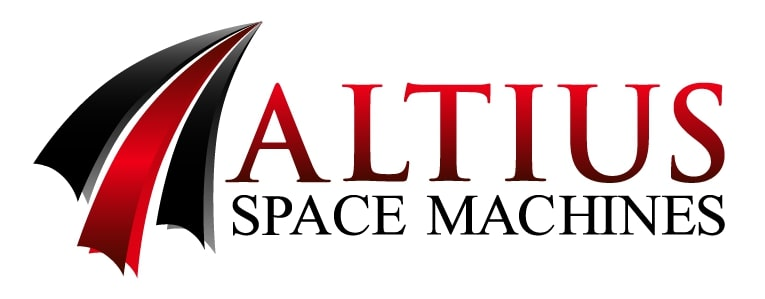

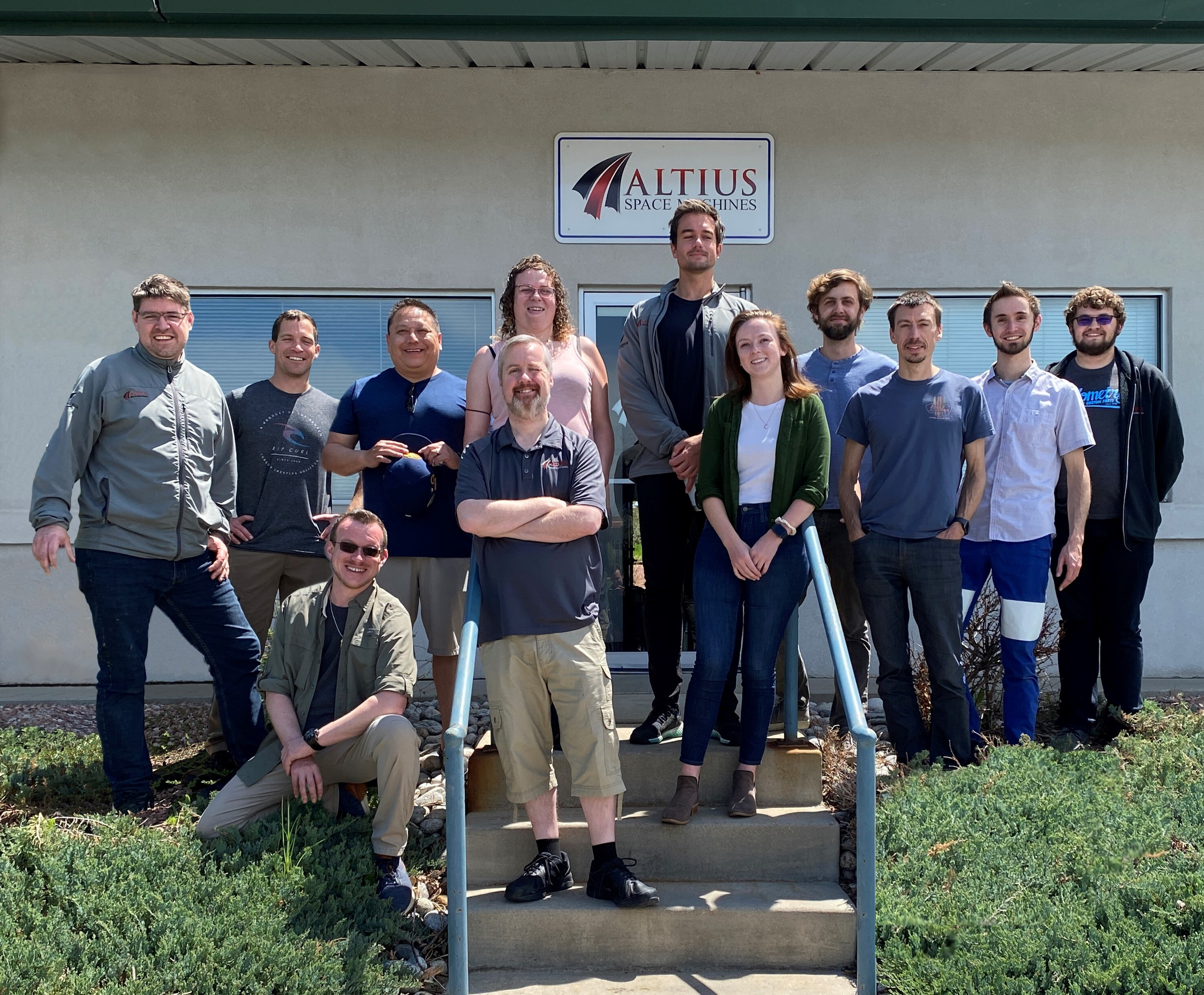
- Altius Team Photo
- Type: Private
- Industry: Aerospace
- Founded: 2010; 16 years ago
- Founder: Jonathan Goff
- Headquarters: 3001 Industrial Ln #5, Broomfield, Colorado, U.S.
- Key people: Patrick Loner (President & CEO)

Altius Space Machines is a subsidiary company of Voyager Space Holdings (Jan 2020), based in Broomfield, CO dedicated to engineering the future in Aerospace.

Core Capabilities

- Ideation, Conceptual Design, and Research and Development, Flight Hardware Manufacturing
- System and Architecture Level Ideation and Design
- Electropermanent Magnet (EPM)
- Electrical/Mechanical/Robotics Systems
- Cryogenic Fluid Systems
- Space Environmental Testing Lab (TVAC, Vibe, HALT/HASS)

== History ==
=== 2010–2012 ===
In 2010, Altius Space Machines, with support from the SRI International invented the "Sticky Boom" Electroadhesive Boom-Rendezvous system to solve several of the key challenges associated with rendezvous and capture of the Orbiting Sample Canister (OSC) for a Mars Sample Return (MSR) mission. This system significantly improves on previously proposed sample canister capture systems, by providing the following key features:

- High inherent safety — Contact and capture event takes place at a significant distance from the orbiter
- Electromechanical steering for the last few meters of the OS rendezvous and capture process – Reduces rendezvous propellant consumption
- High tolerance for positioning and velocity errors between orbiter and target – Reduces requirements for precision control of orbiter during the capture maneuver.
- Very low mass and volume compared to other solutions
- The same system can capture the OS and transfer it to an Earth Entry Vehicle using the same hardware.
- Provides a simple means of reliable, non-mechanical contact and proximity detection.
- Low-risk solution—booms are based on systems with extensive flight experience, the capture device has seen extensive testing in a terrestrial environment as well as successful preliminary microgravity dynamic testing aboard a parabolic aircraft.
- Small enough for affordable near-term testing in LEO using CubeSat or other rideshare opportunities.

In July 2011, Altius Space Machines won first place in the 2011 NewSpace Business Plan Competition in Silicon Valley, sponsored by the Space Frontier Foundation.

Altius won a contract with DARPA in July 2012 to build a composite extensible robotic boom arm for the DARPA Phoenix project. They also began work in 2012 developing Gecko-adhesive grippers, as part of work to build a Gecko Gripper Touch-to-Grasp tool that incorporated JPL’s "synthetic Gecko adhesive technology that mimics the ability of Gecko lizards to adhere to walls." The work leveraged previous work done by Altius on uncooperative capture mechanisms using electroadhesion.

=== 2013–Present ===
In 2014, Altius began work on a MagnetoShell aerocapture and aerobraking technology for cubesats. Called MIDAS, Multi-Purpose Interplanetary Deployable Aerocapture System, the 6U CubeSats will be designed to be used on an interplanetary mission such as to Mars, Venus, or Jupiter's moon Europa

Other work includes the "Kraken Asteroid Boulder Retrieval System." In late 2014, Altius expects to test prototypes of grasping arms and non-force-closure gripper concepts for capturing a boulder off the surface of an asteroid. The study is funded by NASA as part of their broader Asteroid Redirect Mission (ARM) project and is intended to mature system concepts and key technologies while assessing the feasibility of potential commercial partnerships for ARM.

In 2015 Altius won a contract to build lightweight robotic manipulators, that utilize rollable composite STEM booms to provide a prismatic extension/retraction DOF, as robot arms for Assistive Free-Flyers (AFFs) on the International Space Station. These Low-Inertia STEM Arm (LISA) manipulators can provide comparable or better manipulation capabilities to AFFs than traditional robotic manipulators, but with less mass, lower inertia, better stowability, and the ability to reach into hard-to-access locations.:

== Product Line ==
=== DogTag™ ===
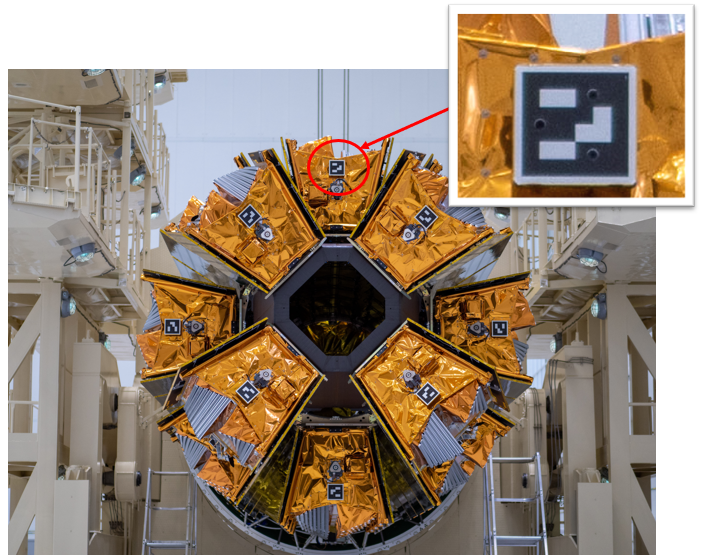
DogTags™ installed on Airbus-OneWeb satellites. credit: Roscosmos

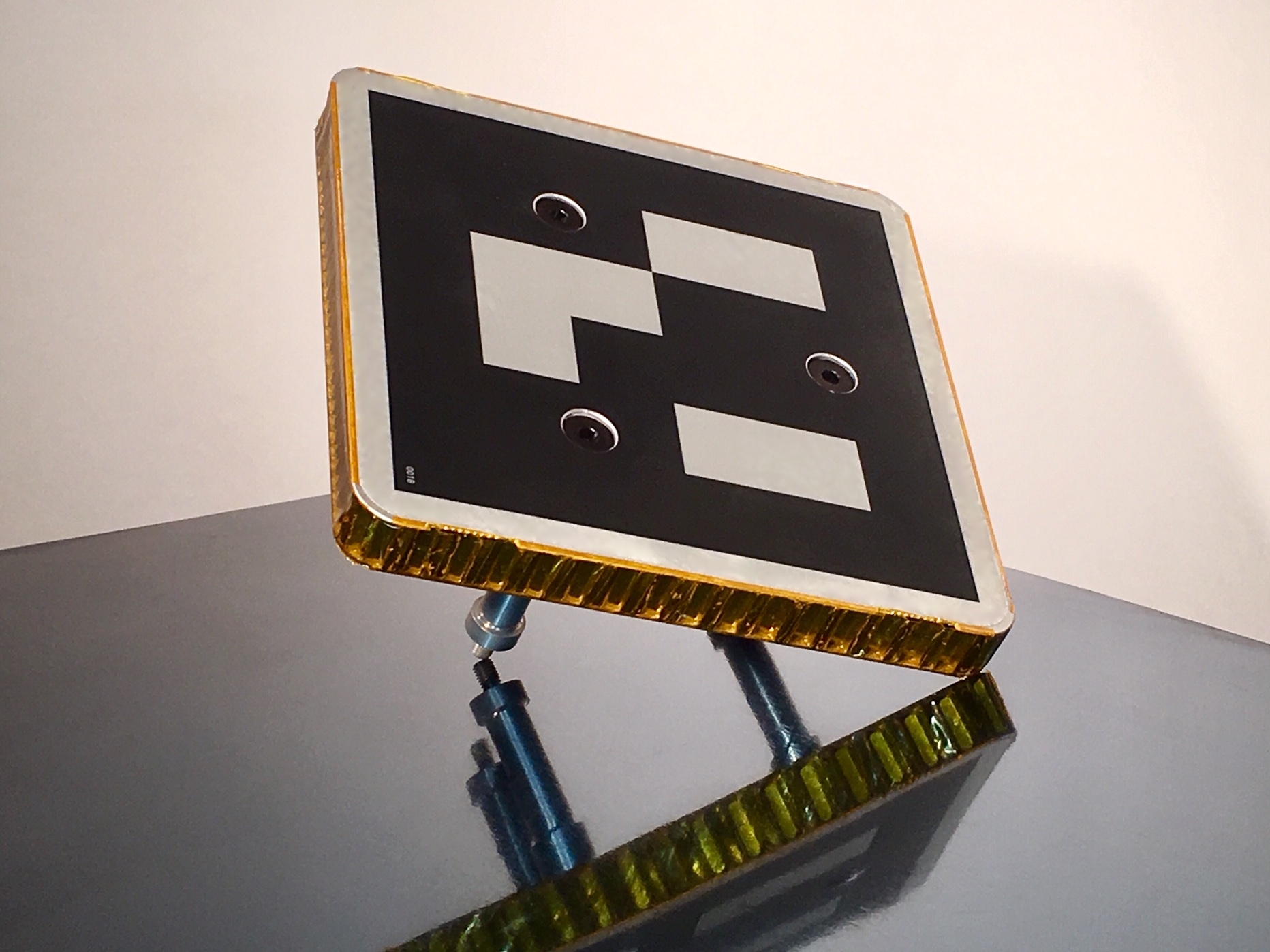
DogTag™

The DogTag™ is a universal grapple fixture that supports a wide variety of capture methods. : Patent number: US 2019/0241286A1

- Mechanical Grasping
- Snare Capture
- Magnetic Capture
- Gecko Adhesion
- Electrostatic Adhesion
- Chemical Adhesion
- Harpoon Capture

Hundreds of units are currently in orbit with hundreds more scheduled to be launched fully space-qualified to stringent Airbus-OneWeb Satellites requirements. OneWeb YouTube Video

=== Electropermanent Magnets (EPMs) ===
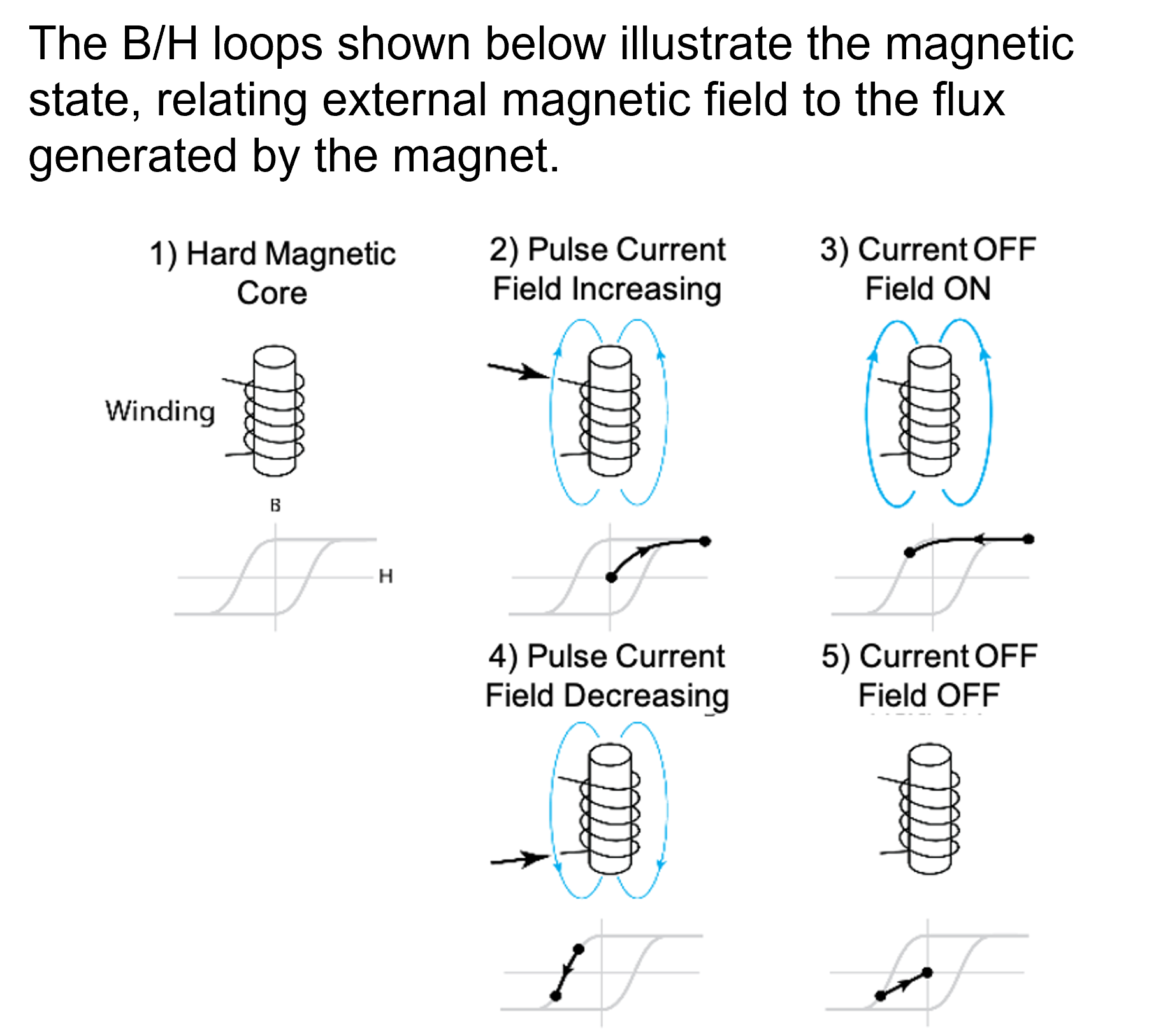

An electropermanent magnets (EPM) is an Altius Space Machines patented technology, which offer numerous benefits over existing mechanical or magnetic interfaces. EPMs are solid-state switchable magnets, with no moving parts and can be put into an unlimited number of form factors. Patent number: 10984936
Combines the best characteristics of both varieties to provide a desired magnetic field that:

- Very strong grip – 500 kPa already demonstrated (72.5 psi), theoretically capable of up to 1 MPa (145 psi)
- No power to maintain state, only to change state
- Solid-state, no moving parts
- Simple command and control
- Available in dual-mode (Distance Attraction/Surface Grip/Off) or single-mode (On/Off)
- Magnetic field is tightly constrained and does not create any significant magnetic flux beyond the passive-interface

EPMs combine the tunability of electromagnets with the stability of permanent magnets to produce a uniquely capable magnetic latch with no moving parts

==== Dual-Mode EPM ====
Altius is currently working to develop the Dual-Mode EPM. This EPM will have a "Long-Range Mode" (LRM) and a "Short-Range Mode" (SRM). The LRM will exert meaningful force at a distance of 5 cm, exert slight force at 10–20 cm, and Grip force at contact sufficient to prevent "bouncing off". SRM achieves grip pressure = 200 kPA. Patent Pending: 20210210267

==== EPM Based Products ====
Altius has developed many products that contain EPM Technology and continues to invent new and innovative products to meet the needs of On-Orbit servicing.

===== MagTag™ =====
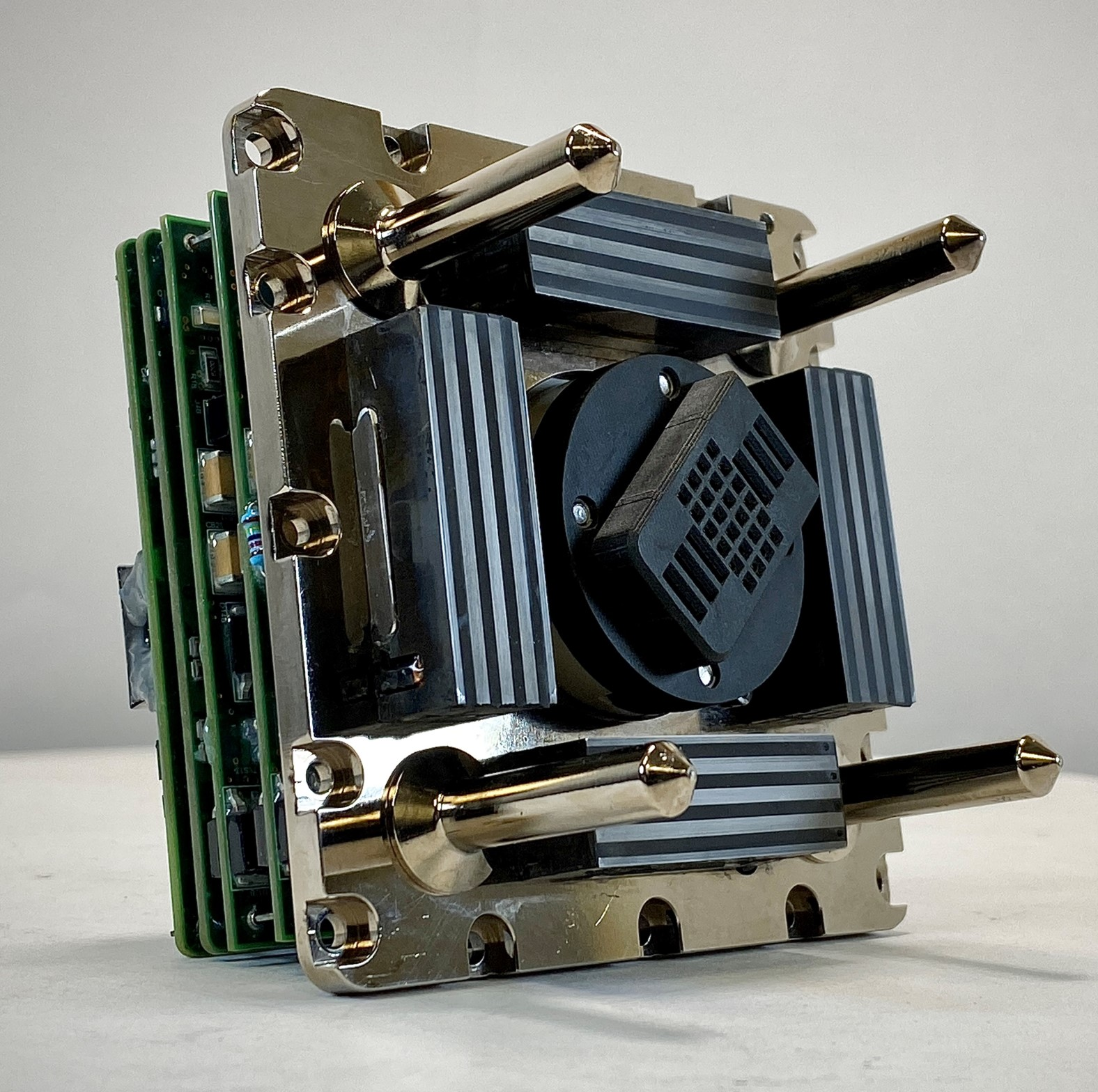
MagTag™ with Power/Data Transfer Core

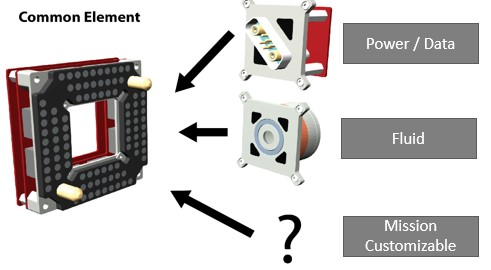
MagTag™ Configurable Center Core

Altius has developed a MagTag Modular Interface which allows for a new paradigm in spacecraft design, construction, and servicing: an EPM latched electrical and/or fluid connection interface.

- Robust: EPMs offer a strong (1 kN) magnetic connection with no moving parts
- Lightweight & Low-profile: <500g total, each interface half can fit within a 10 x 10 x 5 cm envelope
- Latching: EPMs only require power (<20J) to change gripping states from on-to-off and will maintain the latch without active power
- Highly-Capable: The baseline design supports 600W of transferred power at 28V, and over 1 Gbit/s data transfer rates
- Launch Lock Capable: MagTags are strong enough to support multi-kg payloads during launch
- Scalable: Arrays of MagTags on a pallet can support a variety of modules and sub-modules for installation

===== Magnetic Tool Changer =====
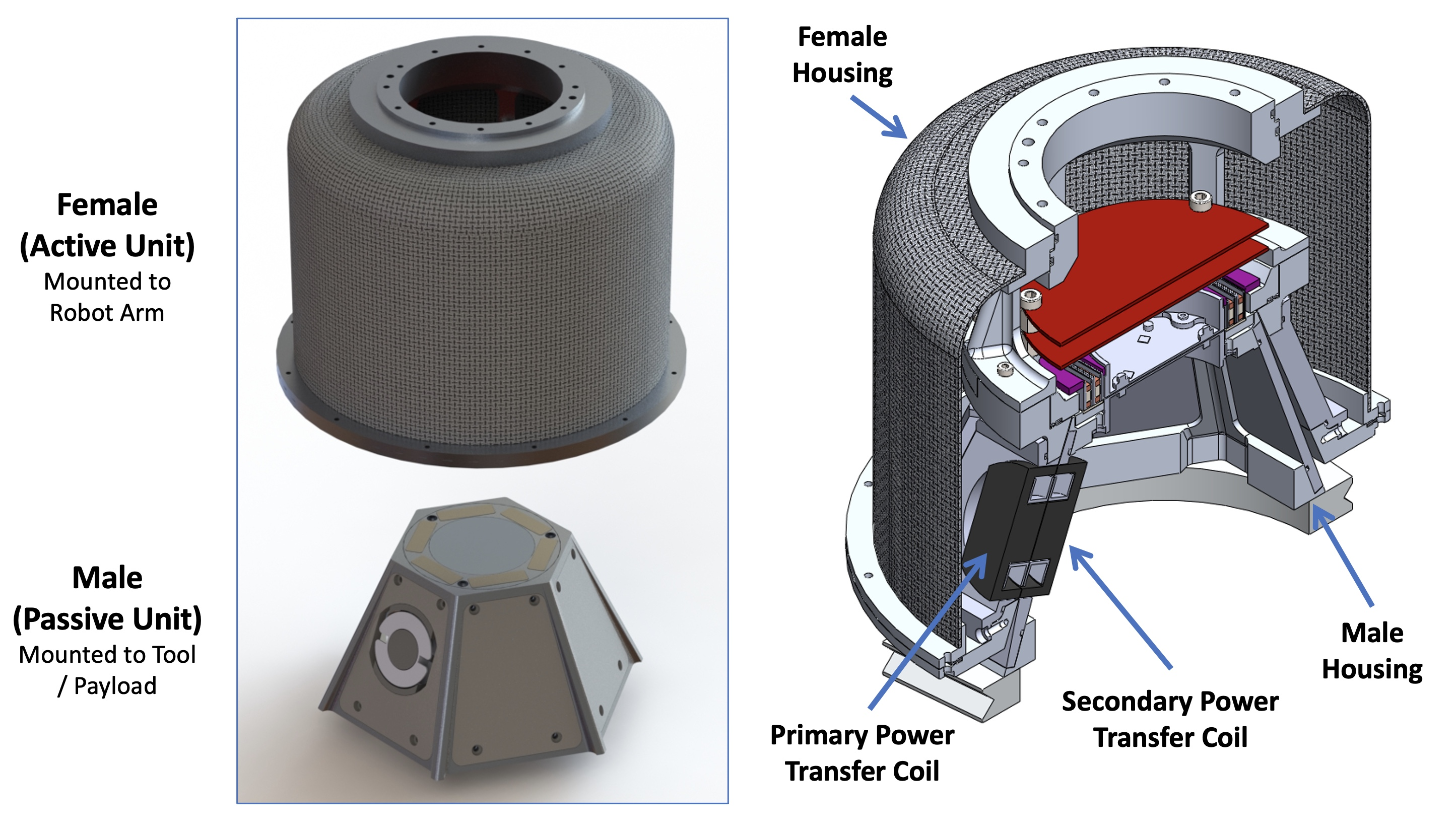
Tool Changer Detailed Design Overview

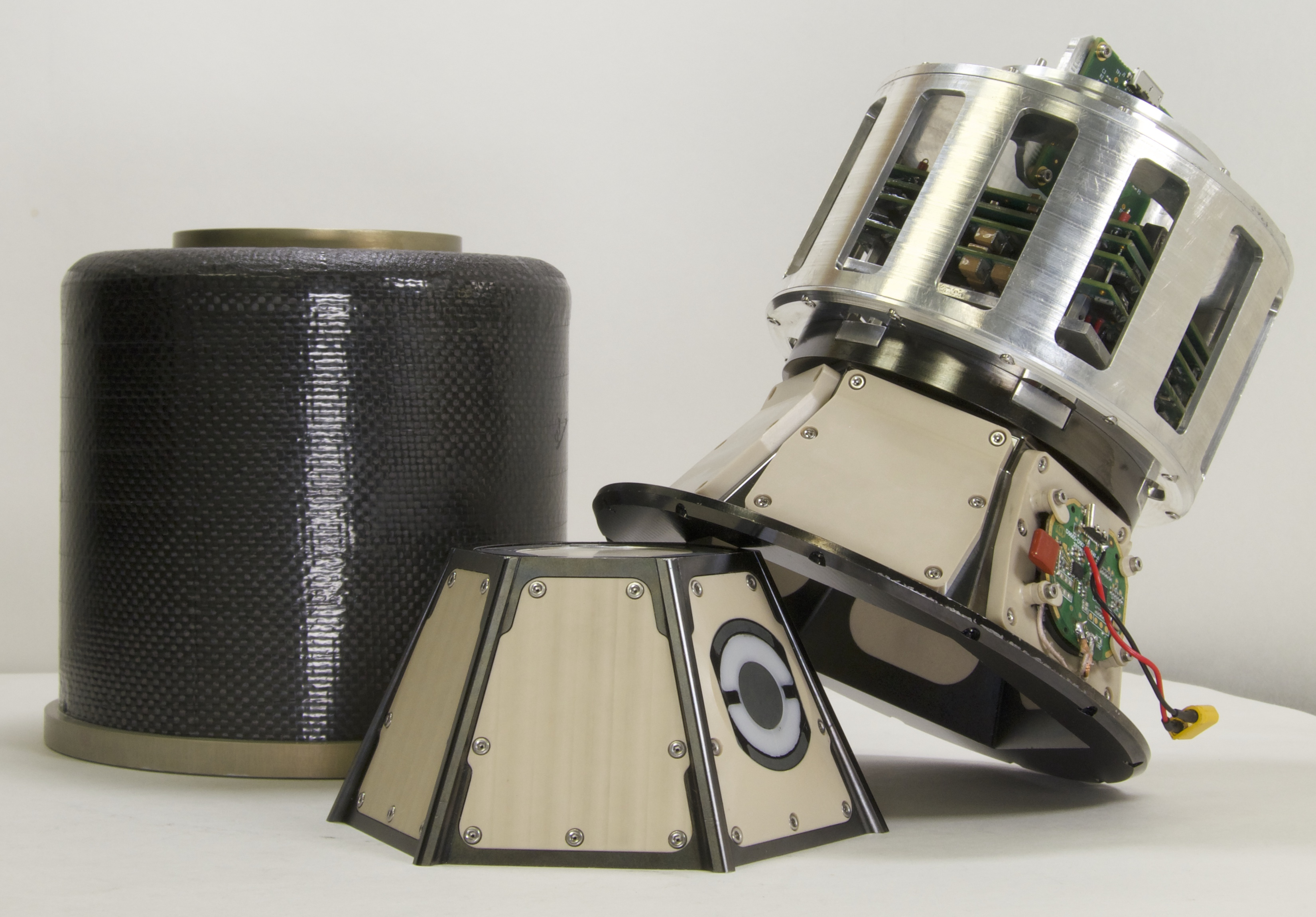
Designed for Lunar and Planetary applications

Altius' Magnetic Tool Changer uses a solid-state switchable EPM magnetic latch and acts as a robotic end-effector. The robotic side connects to a tool side that can have a number of different tools (robotic or traditional). If the tool side is robotic, the tool changer can provide power and data to the tool and use it as if it were hard-wired.

- Dust-Tolerant Hermetic Design: Designed without any exposed moving electrical or mechanical parts on either side of the interface.
- High Reliability: Has no moving parts, dramatically increasing the reliability over traditional mechanical tool changers.
- Low Actuation Power: Solid-state switchable magnet design has low peak power consumption (<5W if desired), only consuming power when the magnet is switching from on to off.
- Lightweight/Compact: By eliminating the need for complex mechanical latching systems, the proposed tool changer can be dramatically lighter than traditional mechanical tool changers.
- Tight Reach Capability: The compact EPM tool changer enables the insertion of sampling tools or sensors into much tighter geometric areas than would be possible with a turret or mechanical tool changer design.
- Power and Data Transfer: The Tool Changer is capable of wireless power (inductive) and data transfer >100 watts and up to 870 Mbit/s. Data is transferred using Keyssa technology.

===== ESCHER (example) =====
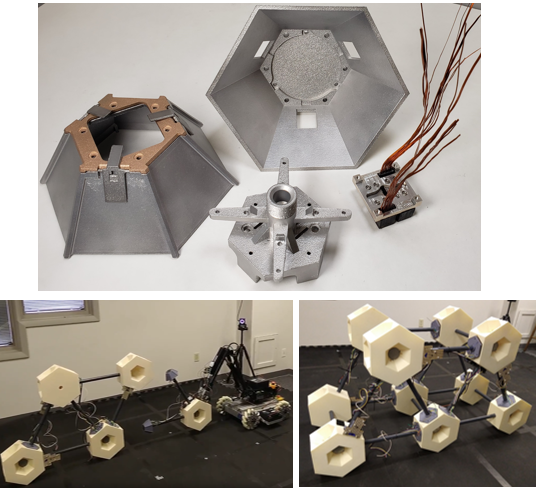
ESCHER interface shell and complete structure

Altius was selected under NASA's SBIR to develop the Experimental Swarm Construction Hardware EPM based Robotic interface (ESCHER) for NASA's In-Space Assembly (ISA) initiative of modular satellites and space facilities.

NASA Applications

- In Space Assembly (ISA) of modular satellites and space facilities
- Rapid assembly/disassembly structures enabling multi-robot missions for collaborative planetary exploration
- Universal interface for swarm assemble-able orbital and planetary structures

Terrestrial Applications

- Payload quick swap interface for hosted and replaceable payloads
- UAV interface for docking, recharging, and payload manipulation.
- Universal interface for robotic assembly/disassembly terrestrial structures in remote, harsh environments

===== Cryogenic Fluid Connector for In-Space Refueling =====
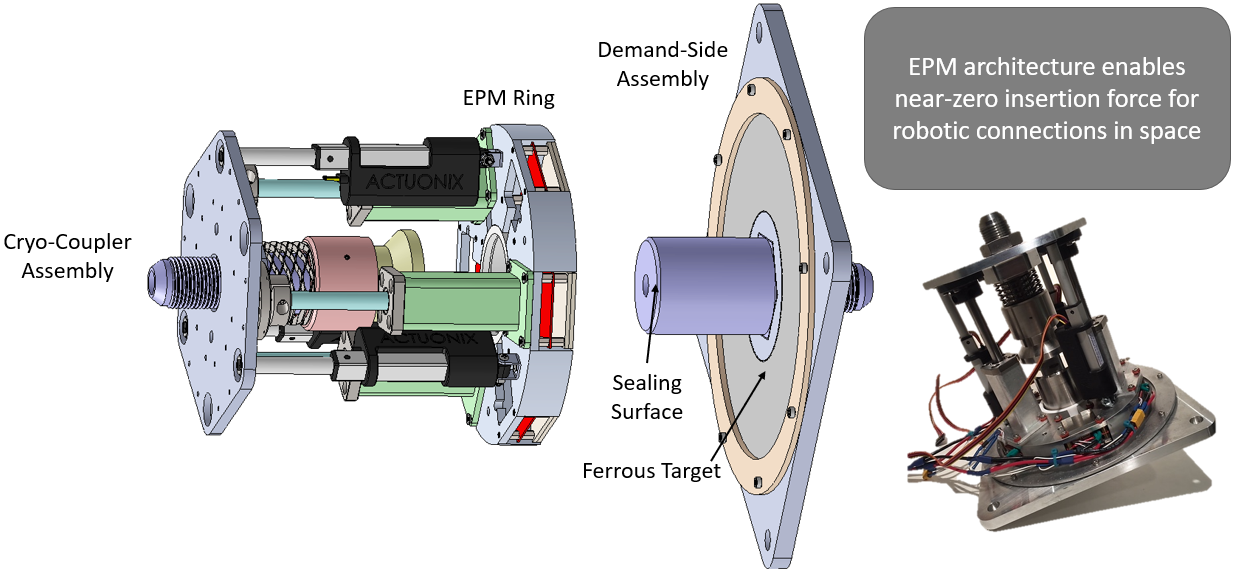

Features:

- Designed to re-use existing match-plate valve stems on launch vehicles
- Zero mating force connection using solid-state electro-permanent magnets (EPMs)
- Mating and blowoff forces reacted locally by a dedicated draw-down mechanism consisting of a linear servo array
- Dual poppet for dry disconnect
- Self aligning

Specifications:

- Avg. Helium Leak Rate @ 50psi: 0.00001 cc/sec
- Proof tested to 100psi hydrostatically
- Flow coefficient (water): 4.9-5.3
- Magnetic latch tested up to 1000N (force sensor limit)
- Maximum latching force of 2135 N

=== Space-Rated Propellant Transfer Valve (PTV) ===
Altius' Active Assembly PTV Rendering of Actuation

Altius has developed an Electromechanically driven propellant transfer valve for the transfer of fluid or gas. Contains a paired Active and Passive Assembly for a tolerant fluid coupling.

- Active Assembly mass: <1.2 kg
- Passive Assembly mass: <0.3 kg
- MAWP: 725 PSI
- Total Stroke: 1.75"
- Tolerant of mechanical misalignment and thermal gradients
