= United Kingdom Global Navigation Satellite System =

Satellite research programme, 2018–2020

- Country/ies of origin: United Kingdom
- Operator(s): UK Space Agency, part of HM Government
- Type: Military, civilian
- Status: Reset into new programme
- Coverage: Global

Orbital characteristics
- Regime: proposed: Medium Earth orbit

Other details
- Cost: projected: £5 bn

The United Kingdom Global Navigation Satellite System (UK GNSS) was a United Kingdom Space Agency research programme which, between May 2018 and September 2020, developed outline proposals for a UK-owned and operated conventional satellite navigation system, as a British alternative to the European Union's Galileo system. The main motivation was to provide a national and independent system, to ensure UK security following its withdrawal from the EU as a result of Brexit. The programme was supported by the Ministry of Defence.

In September 2020, the UK GNSS programme concluded; it was relaunched as a new entity, the United Kingdom Space Based Positioning, Navigation and Timing Programme (UK SBPNTP).

== History ==
With the now universal reliance on the output provided by satellite navigation systems in many aspects of everyday life, in both private and commercial sectors, along with critical uses by military, maritime, and emergency services, continued and reliable access to such navigation systems is vital for the United Kingdom. An earlier study by the UK government warned that sustained disruption to a reliable satellite navigation could cost the British economy £1 billion per day.

The United Kingdom Global Navigation Satellite System was first discussed by the UK government in May 2018, after the European Union told the United Kingdom that it would no longer have full access to the Galileo system, nor be able to use its encrypted secure component (known as the Public Regulated Service, which is only accessible to the military, emergency services, and government agencies). The UK's exclusion from Galileo was due to the withdrawal of the UK from the EU. Prior to leaving, the UK had contributed more than £1.2 billion towards Galileo, together with providing technology. One suggested name for the new UK system was "Newton", after the English mathematician and scientist Sir Isaac Newton.

The UK GNSS was run by the United Kingdom Space Agency (UKSA). Satellites would be launched into Medium Earth orbit from the proposed spaceport in Sutherland, Scotland, using a vertical launch platform. The first launches would be in 2025, with the United Kingdom GNSS planned to be fully operational by 2030. In 2019, it was estimated that the cost of the project would be £5 billion.

The United Kingdom government said that it wanted its GNSS to be openly compatible with the United States of America's Global Positioning System (GPS), and the Five Eyes intelligence alliance. The USA, and the other Five Eyes nations, contributed expertise to assist the planning and construction, and in exchange, these nations would gain access to the United Kingdom's GNSS encrypted area after it was launched.

In November 2019, the United Kingdom's Space Trade Association released a United Kingdom Space Manifesto, in which they state "the UK's post-Brexit participation in a new global satellite navigation system must be secured".

In July 2020, the United Kingdom government and India's Bharti Enterprises were successful in a joint bid to purchase the bankrupt OneWeb satellite communications company, with the UK paying £400 million (US$500 million) for a 45% stake. As a result of further investment in OneWeb from companies including SoftBank Group, Hughes Network Systems, and Hanwha Group, the UK government's stake was reduced to less than 20%. The UK government was considering whether the OneWeb Low Earth orbit satellite constellation could in future provide a form of GNSS service in addition to its primary purpose of fast satellite broadband. If successful, an ongoing merger between OneWeb and French satellite operator Eutelsat, which is partly state-owned through Bpifrance, would result in both UK and French government representation on the board of the resulting company. Analysts speculated that this could mean greater collaboration between the UK and EU with regards to satellite technology.

On 24 September 2020, the UK government announced that the UK GNSS programme would be replaced with a new project – the Space Based Positioning, Navigation and Timing Programme – which would explore innovative ways to provide satellite navigation services to the UK, building on findings from the concluded UK GNSS programme. The UK government had allocated £90 million to developing the proposals.

== See also ==
- United Kingdom Space Command
- GNSS applications
- GNSS augmentation
- Automotive navigation system
- European Space Agency
