= Rwandatel =

Defunct Rwandan telephone company

- Industry: Telecommunications
- Founded: 1993
- Headquarters: Kigali, Rwanda
- Products: Telecommunications services Internet services
- Website: www.rwandatel.rw

Rwandatel was a telephony company with its headquarters in Kigali, Rwanda.

== History ==
Rwandatel was founded in 1993 as a government parastatal to provide telephone and internet services, including local telephony and long-distance service.

In 2006, American born Greg Wyler took 99% control of Rwandatel through his communication firm Terracom.

Due to financial constraints, the government of Rwanda held negotiations with Terracom's investors in June 2007 in order to establish the value of the company and organize a buy back of Rwandatel by the government. The agreed total purchase price was US$11.91 million, with the government acquiring 70%, while Caisse Sociale du Rwanda (now Rwanda Social Security Board) acquiring 30% of the venture.

In September 2007, Libyan based investment firm, LAP (Libyan Investment Portfolio) Green, acquired 80% of Rwandatel for US$100 million and agreed to invest another $177 million over the following five years as well as agree to meet wireless voice and data roll-out goals. LAP Green's other investments included its 69% control of Uganda Telecom.

Due to the Libyan conflict of 2011, the government of Rwanda complied with United Nations resolutions requiring Libyan assets in the country to be frozen. This led to financial constraints on Rwandatel as it depended of financing from LAP Green. This led to Rwanda Utilities Regulatory Authority (RURA) revoking the firm's license to provide mobile and 3G services on April 4, 2011. At this point the company was facing stiff competition from MTN Rwanda and Tigo Rwanda.

In 2013, the assets of the insolvent Rwandatel were acquired by Econet Wireless through its subsidiary Liquid Telecom for US$4 million, a fraction of the LAP Green deal.

== Ownership ==
As of the liquidation date, Rwandatel's shareholding structure was as follows:

Rwandatel stock ownership
Rank	Name of owner	Percentage ownership
1	LAP Green of Libya	80.0
2	Rwanda Social Security Board	20.0
	Total	100.0
