= JoeySat =

European technology demonstration satellite launched in 2023

- Mission type: Technology demonstration
- Operator: European Space Agency (United Kingdom) UK Space Agency; Eutelsat OneWeb
- COSPAR ID: 2023-068R
- Mission duration: 7 years (planned); 2 years, 5 months, 26 days (in progress)

Start of mission
- Launch date: 20 May 2023, 13:16 UTC
- Rocket: Falcon 9
- Launch site: SLC-4E

Orbital parameters
- Altitude: 1,200 km

JoeySat is a technology demonstrator satellite developed by the European Space Agency (ESA), the UK Space Agency (UKSA), and Eutelsat OneWeb. During its two-year primary mission between 2023 and 2025, the satellite has successfully demonstrated various innovative technologies for communication satellites including "beam-hopping", where the satellite can swiftly switch its coverage between different locations, responding rapidly to changes in demand. JoeySat was launched on 20 May 2023 on a Falcon 9 rocket.

== See also ==
- List of European Space Agency programmes and missions
