= Terracom =

Rwandan telecommunications company

- Industry: Telecommunications
- Headquarters: Kigali
- Products: Telecommunications services Internet services
- Website: www.terracom.rw

Terracom is a telecommunications company of Rwanda, which provides internet service and telephone service. The company is headquartered in Kigali and its principal competitor in Rwanda is Rwandatel.
