= Electroadhesion =

Electroadhesion is the electrostatic effect of astriction between two surfaces subjected to an electrical field. Applications include the retention of paper on plotter surfaces, astrictive robotic prehension (electrostatic grippers), electroadhesive displays, etc. Clamping pressures in the range of 0.5 to 1.5 N/cm^{2} (0.8 to 2.3 psi) have been claimed. Currently, the maximum lateral pressure achievable through electroadhesion is 85.6 N/cm^{2}.

An electroadhesive pad consists of conductive electrodes placed upon a polymer substrate. When alternate positive and negative charges are induced on adjacent electrodes, the resulting electric field sets up opposite charges on the surface that the pad touches, and thus causes electrostatic adhesion between the electrodes and the induced charges in the touched surface material.

Electroadhesion can be loosely divided into two basic forms: that which concerns the prehension of electrically conducting materials where the general laws of capacitance hold (D = E ε) and that used with electrically insulating subjects where the more advanced theory of electrostatics (D = E ε + P) applies. In practice, surface irregularities such as waviness, wrinkles, and roughness introduce air gaps. Some models account for these effects by incorporating a layer that represents these air gaps.

Recently, electroadhesion has been garnering increasing attention from both academia and industry. It is being proposed for application in various fields, including gripping devices, climbing robots, VR haptics, and variable stiffness mechanisms.
