= Eutelsat OneWeb =

Global communications company

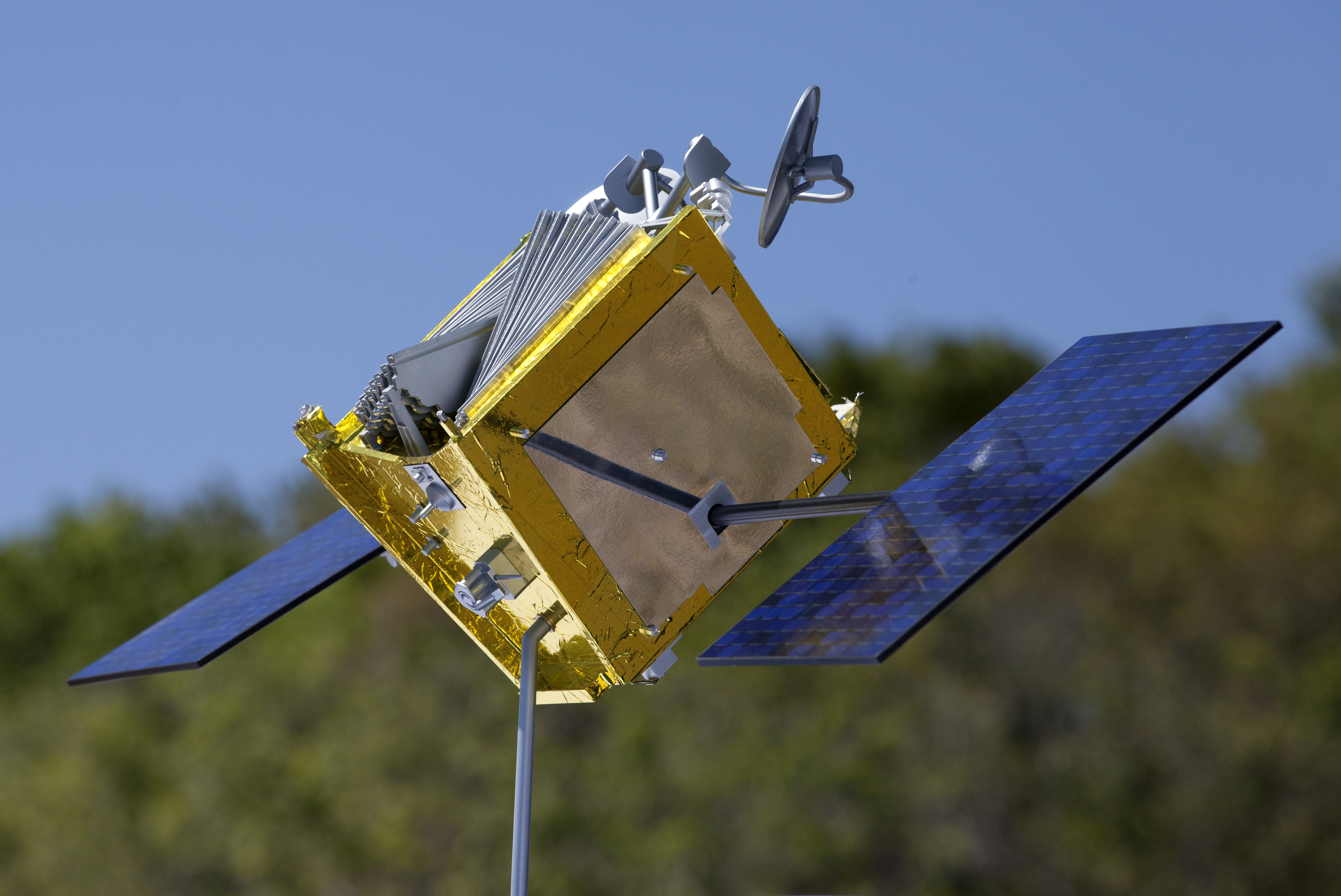
- Model of a first generation OneWeb satellite
- Type: Subsidiary
- Industry: Satellite Internet access
- Predecessor: WorldVu Satellites
- Founded: 2012; 14 years ago
- Founder: Greg Wyler
- Area served: Worldwide
- Key people: Eva Berneke (CEO)
- Owner: Bharti Space (21%)
- Number of employees: ▲ ~600 (March 2022)
- Parent: Eutelsat Group
- Subsidiaries: Airbus OneWeb Satellites (50% owner)
- Website: oneweb.net

Eutelsat OneWeb is a subsidiary of the French group Eutelsat providing broadband satellite Internet services in low Earth orbit (LEO). The company has offices in Paris (France), London (UK) and Virginia (US), and satellite manufacturing facilities in Florida and Toulouse – Airbus OneWeb Satellites – that is a joint venture with Airbus Defence and Space.

The company was founded as WorldVu by Greg Wyler in 2012 and later, as OneWeb, launched its first six satellites in February 2019. It entered bankruptcy in March 2020 after failing to raise the required capital to complete the build and deployment of the remaining 90% of the network. The company emerged from the bankruptcy proceedings and reorganisation in November 2020 with a new ownership group. As of 2021, Indian multinational company Bharti Global, France-based satellite service provider Eutelsat and the Government of the United Kingdom were the company's largest shareholders, while Japan's SoftBank retained an equity holding of 12%.

In March 2023, the number of satellites reached 618, enough to provide global coverage. In September 2023, Eutelsat announced the completion of its merger with OneWeb and the creation of a new Eutelsat Group company, with subsidiaries Eutelsat and Eutelsat OneWeb.

== History ==
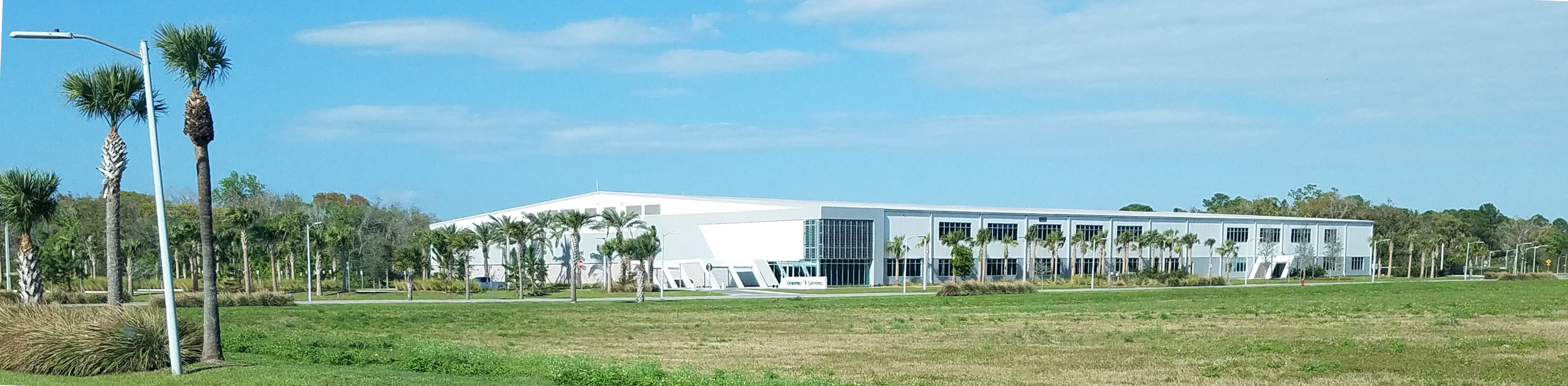
OneWeb satellite manufacturing facility in Merritt Island, Florida.

The company was founded in 2012 under the name WorldVu, and was based in Britain's Channel Islands.

=== Google participation and transfer of the spectrum ===
Early reports of Google entry into broadband internet services emerged in February 2014, when Greg Wyler, along with two collaborators— Michael Tseytlin, who led engineering, and Steven Fay, who oversaw finance - developed and popularised the concept of a mega-constellation with as many as 1600 satellites. In May 2014, the early concept had been to have at least 20 satellites operating in each of 20 orbital planes to provide consistent internet coverage over the surface of the Earth.

By June 2014, WorldVu (later to be renamed to OneWeb) had acquired the satellite spectrum that was formerly owned by SkyBridge, a company that went bankrupt in 2000, in a much earlier attempt to offer broadband Internet services via satellite.

By September 2014, the WorldVu company had 30 employees, and several Google employees who had joined Google as part of the acquisition of O3b Networks in 2013 — Greg Wyler, Brian Holz, Michael Tseytlin and David Bettinger — left Google to become a part of WorldVu Satellites Ltd. They took with them the rights to a certain radio frequency spectrum that could be used to provide Internet access. At the time, WorldVu was working closely with SpaceX and SpaceX's founder Elon Musk to explore satellite internet services, although no formal relationship had been established and no launch commitments had been made in 2014.

=== SpaceX, initial manufacturing plans ===
By November 2014, The Wall Street Journal reported that Musk and Wyler were considering options for building a factory to manufacture high-volume low-cost satellites, and that "initial talks had been held with state officials in Florida and Colorado" about potentially locating a factory in those states, as well as that SpaceX would likely launch the satellites. Also in November 2014, WorldVu issued a tender "to satellite manufacturers for 640 125-kg satellites", asking for responses by mid-December 2014, having secured regulatory approval for use of the requisite electromagnetic spectrum communication frequencies in mid-2014.

The 2014 OneWeb solicitation to satellite manufacturers was for a total build of approximately 900 small Internet-delivery satellites, including ground and on-orbit spares. Responses were received from both European and American manufacturers including Airbus Defence and Space, Lockheed Martin Space Systems, OHB SE, SSL and Thales Alenia Space, and discussions focused on how each of these companies might "escape their status-quo histories as major space hardware contractors and remake themselves into producers capable of producing multiple satellites per month, each with a cost of fewer than US$500,000". OneWeb announced that it planned to form a joint venture with the winning bidder and open a new facility for manufacturing the new smallsats.

=== Funding from Virgin Group and Qualcomm ===
In January 2015, The Wall Street Journal reported that WorldVu, now operating under the name OneWeb Ltd, had secured funding from Virgin Group and Qualcomm to build and launch the constellation. OneWeb also divulged that the planned satellites would weigh approximately 125 kg and that the plans were to deploy approximately 650 of them in low Earth orbit to operate at 1,200 km (750 mi) altitude. Just a few days later, Elon Musk announced the rival Starlink venture, with the opening of the SpaceX satellite development facility in Seattle, Washington, with the intent of taking SpaceX itself into the business of internet provision and internet backhaul services, initially announced as aiming to build an approximately 4000-satellite constellation, with the first generation becoming operational in approximately 2020.

The satellites for the OneWeb constellation were initially announced to be in the 110 kg (240 lb) class, about the same size as the two Earth-imaging satellites that were then operated by Skybox Imaging, which Google acquired in August 2014. However, by the following year, sources put the satellites nearer 150–200 kg (330–440 lb) in mass.

=== Pre-launch agreements and investments ===
In 2015, OneWeb secured US$500 million in funding, and agreed to purchase certain future launch services, from existing aerospace industry companies Arianespace and Virgin Galactic. In June 2015, OneWeb also entered into a deal with Airbus Defence and Space for the construction of its broadband Internet satellites after a competition among American and European manufacturers.

In July 2016, one year after the initial announcement, OneWeb stated they were on schedule. In December 2016, OneWeb raised US$1 billion from SoftBank Group Corp. and US$200 million from existing investors.

In February 2017, OneWeb announced that it expected to sell all of its capacity by launch time. At the time, it had formally announced capacity sold for a joint Gogo and Intelsat venture. OneWeb's founder and then executive chairman Greg Wyler announced he was considering nearly quadrupling the size of the satellite constellation by adding 1972 additional satellites that OneWeb had priority rights to. With the original capital raise of US$500 million in 2015, plus the US$1 billion investment of SoftBank in 2016, previous "investors committed to an additional US$200 million, bringing OneWeb's total capital raised to US$1.7 billion". A merger arrangement with Intelsat that had been in negotiations during May 2017 collapsed in June 2017 and did not go forward.

=== Manufacturing and constellation rollout ===
The constellation was originally announced in June 2014 to be just half of the total of approximately 720 satellites. A quarter of the satellites were to make up the initial constellation, and these would operate in the lower of the two proposed orbits, at approximately 850 km (530 mi). The initial constellation would presumably be raised or lowered into its final orbital altitude of either 800 km (500 mi) or 950 km (590 mi) as consumer and business use of the broadband service grows over time. By early 2015, OneWeb indicated that the first launches would occur no earlier than 2017.

In February 2016, OneWeb announced that they would set up an assembly and test facility in Florida with plans to assemble and launch the majority of the satellites by the end of 2019, while manufacturing an additional 250 of the 140 kg-satellites as spares to be used in later years.

In 2019, OneWeb had formed a joint venture, OneWeb Satellites, with the European company Airbus Defence and Space in order to manufacture its satellites in higher volume and at lower cost than any satellites previously built by Airbus. A manufacturing facility was built in Merritt Island, Florida. Initial satellite production at the new facility began in mid-2019 and by January 2020, the factory reached the target production rate of two satellites per day.

By the time the actual orbital deployment of the constellation began, in February 2019, the planned constellation size had settled once again at 648, near the original projection, with 600 active satellites and 48 on-orbit spares.

In January 2020, OneWeb reached a production rate of two satellites per day. In February 2020, the company launched its first large batch of satellites.

In January 2021, OneWeb amended its application with the Federal Communications Commission (FCC) to change the number of satellites planned for its Phase Two constellation to 6,372.

=== First launches and additional investments ===
On 27 February 2019, OneWeb launched its first six satellites into 1,200 km low Earth orbit from the Centre Spatial Guyanais in French Guiana using a Soyuz-2 launch vehicle. The same day OneWeb announced that it had signed its first two client agreements marking the beginning of its commercialisation. On 18 March 2019, OneWeb announced it had secured US$1.25 billion in funding following a successful first launch. The funding was from existing investors SoftBank and Qualcomm, as well as Grupo Salinas and the Government of Rwanda.

By August 2019, the company had six of its satellites broadcasting at the right frequencies for 90 days, meeting the "use-it-or-lose-it" spectrum conditions set by the United Nations' International Telecommunication Union (ITU). This secured the rights OneWeb needed to operate its global satellite broadband network.

In February and March 2020, the company launched an additional 68 satellites to orbit, stating that launches would be paused to allow a minor design modification to be made before planning to resume in May 2020.

=== Bankruptcy ===
On 27 March 2020, OneWeb Global Limited and 18 affiliates filed for bankruptcy in the United States Bankruptcy Court for the Southern District of New York. The company said the decision was made because of the financial impact of the COVID-19 pandemic. The company laid off approximately 85% of its approximately 500 employees, but retained the capability to control its operational satellites during the period of court protection.

On 3 July 2020, a consortium led by Bharti Global and the Government of the United Kingdom won the auction to purchase the bankrupt company. The sale closed in November, allowing the company to exit Chapter 11 bankruptcy.

=== Exit from bankruptcy protection ===
On 3 July 2020, the Government of the United Kingdom and Sunil Mittal's Bharti Global (formerly a partner of OneWeb) announced a joint plan to invest US$500 million each for equal stakes in OneWeb Global, approximately 42% each; the rest would be held by other creditors including Softbank. The UK government would also hold a golden share to give it control over any future sales. The plan was approved by the United States Bankruptcy Court for the Southern District of New York on 10 July 2020, and the deal closed in November 2020, allowing OneWeb to exit Chapter 11 bankruptcy.

In July 2020, Hughes Network Systems invested US$50 million in the consortium. The same month, the UK government stated an intention to repurpose the OneWeb satellites for its own Global Navigation Satellite System.

Shortly after the July public announcement of the OneWeb sale, a letter from Sam Beckett, the leading civil servant in the UK Department for Business, Energy and Industrial Strategy (BEIS), was released. In the letter, Beckett raised concerns that taxpayers' money could be at risk. The comments were made as part of a request for "ministerial direction", therefore it was required that the letter be made public and any concerns raised be formally overruled. BEIS minister Alok Sharma overrode the concerns and proceeded with the bid.

On 21 September 2020, OneWeb announced that their contract with Arianespace would allow them to resume satellite launch in December 2020.

=== New CEO, launches accelerating ===
In November 2020, the company announced that Neil Masterson, formerly chief operating officer at media company Thomson Reuters, had been appointed CEO. The company launched 36 additional satellites on 17 December 2020. Furthermore, OneWeb announced plans to accelerate launches in 2021 so that the 650 satellites necessary for global coverage would be in orbit by 2022.

=== 2021 ===
In January 2021, a further funding round raised $400 million from SoftBank and Hughes Network Systems, with SoftBank getting a director seat on OneWeb's board. This brought available funding to $1.4 billion, which "positions the company" to fund its first-generation fleet of 648 satellites, but would be insufficient to fund full deployment of the constellation by mid-2022. OneWeb chairman, Sunil Mittal, estimated about a further $1 billion is required, but did not anticipate difficulty in raising that.

In April 2021, OneWeb launched its sixth batch of satellites to orbit. It comprised 36 units, bringing the total in-orbit constellation to 182. In the same month, it was also reported that Eutelsat was putting £400M into the company, in return for a 24% equity stake. Eutelsat's stake decreased to 19.3% when Bharti Global increased its holding in June 2021.

In May 2021, OneWeb announced plans to buy TrustComm, a U.S.-based managed satellite communications provider. After the purchase, the company became OneWeb's government distribution partner, named OneWeb Technologies.

In May 2021, OneWeb's seventh launch took the number of satellites in orbit to 218, to create the second largest fleet behind Starlink. By comparison Starlink had 1,700 satellites by the end of 2021.

In June 2021, Oneweb raised an additional US$500M from Bharti Global, increasing Bharti's holding to 38.6%. In August 2021, Hanwha Systems invested $300 million to purchase an 8.8% share in OneWeb, enabling Hanwha to appoint one member of the board of directors and bring its own dual-use defence and satellite technology to the company.

In October 2021, OneWeb became one of the founding members of Indian Space Association (ISpA). ISpA will act as bridge between Indian Space Research Organisation (ISRO) and private industries to form the space ecosystem in India.

=== 2022 Russia controversy ===
In March 2022, media reported that OneWeb was scheduled to launch a batch of 36 satellites from Baikonur cosmodrome days after Russia's invasion of Ukraine. There were calls for the UK to cancel the launch. Russia said the launch had already been paid for and would not be refunded, and would be cancelled from the Russian side unless OneWeb provided additional assurance that the satellites would never be used for military purposes and the British Government disposed of its shares in the company. The British government refused this demand and the launch was cancelled, along with other Russian launches. OneWeb tried through negotiations to get the stack of 36 satellites back, stranded in Kazakhstan due to political reasons. However, these negotiations never progressed. As OneWeb was on the verge of completing its 1st generation satellite network, they gave up hope in March 2023 on further attempts to get their satellites back, potentially scrapping the batch. The satellites were insured for $50 million, and OneWeb received the insurance money for them.

=== SpaceX/NSIL launch services ===
On 21 March 2022, OneWeb announced that it had signed a launch agreement with United States launch provider SpaceX to launch the remaining satellites on Falcon 9 rockets, with the first launch expected no earlier than summer 2022. On 20 April 2022 OneWeb announced a similar deal with NewSpace India Limited, the commercial arm of the Indian Space Research Organisation. OneWeb satellites were deployed by LVM 3 both on 22 October 2022 and 26 March 2023, using a lightly modified version of the satellite dispenser previously used on Soyuz.

SpaceX was originally contracted to launch three missions for OneWeb. However, an additional flight was contracted on 11 January 2023 for summer 2023 to add backup satellites in orbit. Three flights have been completed so far, the first flight was back on 8 December 2022, and the second was on 10 January 2023. As of early March 2023, there are 584 OneWeb satellites in orbit (two of which are nonoperational), with SpaceX having successfully launched its third flight for OneWeb on March 9, 2023, with a load of 40 satellites.

=== Merger with Eutelsat ===
The merger of OneWeb with France's Eutelsat S.A. – an operator of geostationary satellites – was announced in July 2022. OneWeb shareholders would receive 50% of the enlarged share capital while the British government would retain its golden share or "special share" in OneWeb itself, in a transaction which valued OneWeb at US$3.4 billion (£2.8 billion). The French and British governments are expected to have similar direct stakes of roughly 10% in the new joint entity as well as a seat on the board each.

The board of directors' structure, when the deal is finalised in the third quarter of 2023, will have Eutelsat S.A. chairman Dominique D’Hinnin and CEO Eva Berneke retain their positions in the new company Eutelsat Group. The latter will own Eutelsat S.A and OneWeb (rebranded Eutelsat OneWeb) as subsidiaries. Sunil Bharti Mittal, representing OneWeb will be the co-chair. Eutelsat Group will be headquartered in Paris, France.

Bpifrance and the French Fonds Stratégique de Participations as well as Hanwha Group and the British government are all set to appoint one director each to the new company's board. Meanwhile, OneWeb and Eutelsat S.A. will respectively be allowed to appoint three and four additional directors of their choice.

=== Constellation completion ===
OneWeb became operational for global coverage after launching its final set of 36 satellites on an Indian LVM3 rocket on March 25, 2023.

=== Leap year outage ===
On 31 December 2024, the OneWeb constellation had a 48 hour service outage due to ground equipment software maintained by Hughes Network Systems failing to accommodate the extra day of the 2024 leap year. There was an 80% return to service on 1 January with full service returning on 2 January.

== Intended markets ==
In March 2021, OneWeb stated its market would be primarily businesses, governments including defence, phone network operators and clusters of communities, rather than individual domestic customers which Starlink primarily targets. Users wishing to connect were advised to contact their local telecom operator.

== OneWeb satellite constellation ==
Initially, the OneWeb satellite constellation was planned to have 648 small satellites in low Earth orbit (LEO) that can provide high-speed broadband internet to rural and isolated areas. By January 2023 they had launched 544 satellites, with 542 being functional. The constellation was reportedly "technically completed" in March 2023, with 618 launched. OneWeb engineers would then take a few months to test the system before commercial service was expected to start in the fourth quarter of 2023.

The satellites were built by OneWeb Satellites, a joint venture between Airbus and OneWeb. The satellites are in a circular orbit, at approximately 1,200 km (750 mi) altitude, and transmitting and receiving in the Ku-band radio frequency.

OneWeb's first six satellites were launched on a Soyuz rocket on 27 February 2019. The first large batch of 34 satellites was launched on 6 February 2020, and another 34 were put into orbit on 21 March 2020. These were followed by more launches in 2021. The Russian invasion of Ukraine in February 2022 meant that launches on the Soyuz rocket were suspended, and Arianespace had to find other launch providers for OneWeb. Satellite launches resumed in quarter four of 2022 using the Indian LVM3 rocket and the SpaceX Falcon 9.

== Design ==
=== First generation ===
The satellites in the OneWeb constellation are approximately 150 kg (330 lb) in mass, a bit smaller than the 2015 design estimate of 150–200 kg (330–440 lb). The 648 operational satellites are to operate in 12 near polar orbit planes at 1,200 km (750 mi) altitude, at 86.4° orbital inclination. Initially 18 orbital planes with 49 satellites per plane was planned, requiring 882 satellites plus some spares, but improved satellite coverage capability allowed this to be reduced to 12 planes of 49 satellites requiring 588 satellites plus some on-orbit spares.

The first-generation satellites do not have inter-satellite data links, so can only provide a user service when also in the range of a gateway ground station. As of 2023, OneWeb expect the final operational constellation to be fewer than 1,000 satellites, instead of several thousands being considered earlier. A number of next generation satellites of about 500 kg (1,100 lb) mass may be procured in the future.

The satellites provide user service in the Ku-band. Links to the gateway ground stations are in the Ka-band. The satellites are designed to comply with "orbital debris-mitigation guidelines for removing satellites from orbit and, for low-orbit satellites, assuring that they re-enter the Earth's atmosphere within 25 years of retirement".

== Launches ==
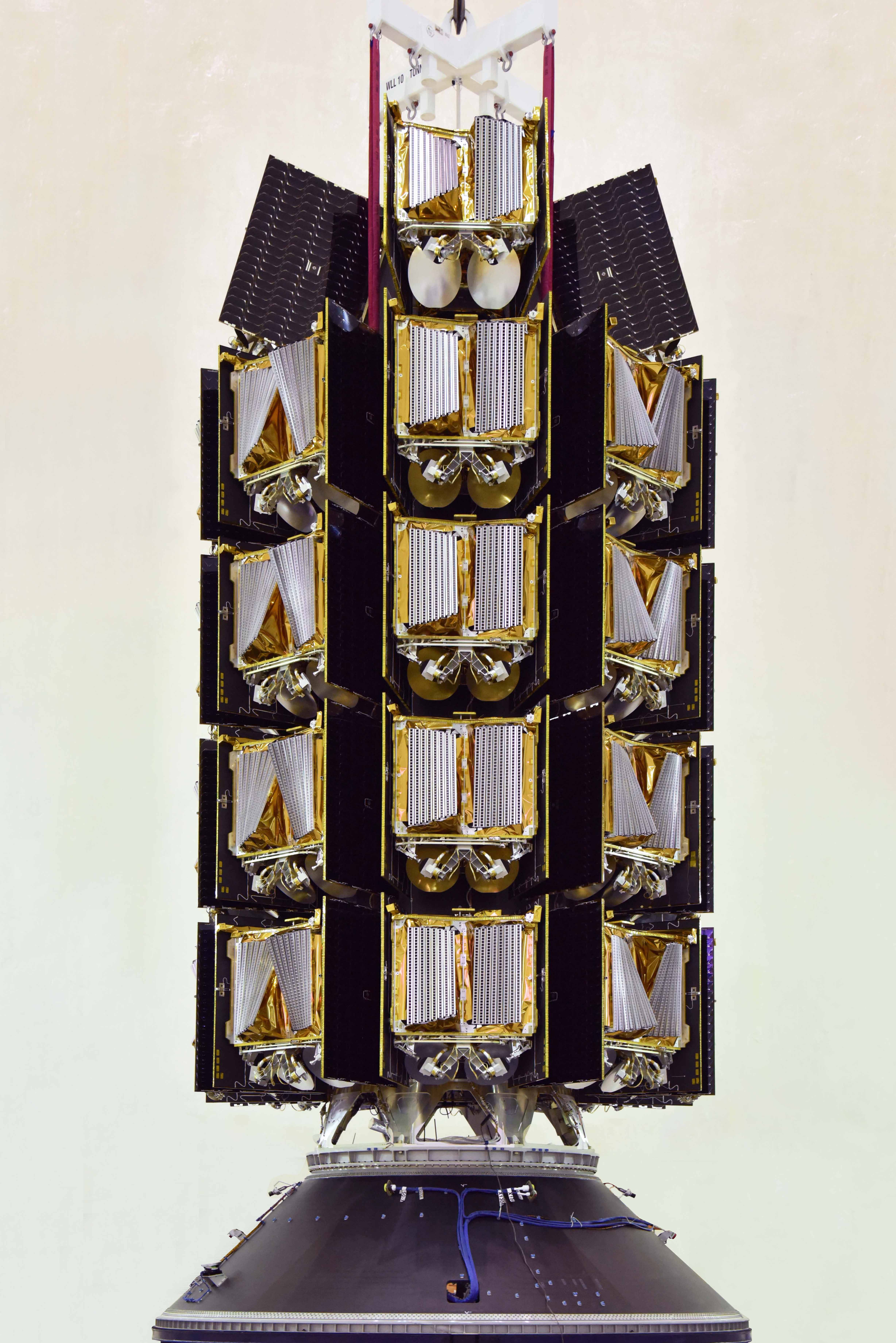
A stack of 36 OneWeb satellites ready for integration to LVM3 rocket for its 14th launch

On 27 February 2019, OneWeb successfully launched the first six of the 648 planned 1st generation satellites (600 active plus 48 on-orbit spares) into low Earth orbit from the Centre Spatial Guyanais using a Russian Soyuz ST-B rocket.

In November 2019, OneWeb planned monthly launches to begin in January 2020, although the first of these launches was delayed to early February 2020, and bankruptcy and subsequent reorganisation delayed the fourth launch to 18 December 2020.

Since the fourth launch, OneWeb has launched five times from Vostochny; once from Kourou; thrice from Baikonur; twice from Sriharikota and four times from Cape Canaveral, with the most recent one being on 20 October 2024. With these launches, OneWeb has taken its in-orbit mega-constellation to 652 operational satellites (2 satellites failed), completing the planned deployment, and making OneWeb the second largest satellite fleet in orbit. These satellites are sufficient to start operational use of the Gen 1 constellation. In their latest launch a second generation demonstration satellite called JoeySat joined the constellation to test some technicalities of the newer satellite.

=== Generation 1 satellites ===
Flight No.	Date/Time (UTC)	Launch complex	Launch site	Launch vehicle	Launch agency	Number deployed	Outcome
1	27 February 2019	Soyuz Launch Complex	Guiana Space Centre, Kourou, French Guiana, France	Soyuz ST-B / Fregat-MT	(Russia) Roscomos	6 (test satellites)	Success
2	6 February 2020	Site 31	Baikonur Cosmodrome, Baikonur, Kyzylorda Region, Kazakhstan	Soyuz 2.1b / Fregat-M	(Russia) Roscomos	34 (first launch of operational satellites)	Success
3	21 March 2020	Site 31	Baikonur Cosmodrome, Baikonur, Kyzylorda Region, Kazakhstan	Soyuz 2.1b / Fregat-M	(Russia) Roscomos	34	Success
4	18 December 2020	Site 1S	Vostochny Cosmodrome, Tsiolkovsky, Amur Oblast, Russia	Soyuz 2.1b / Fregat-M	(Russia) Roscomos	36	Success
5	25 March 2021	Site 1S	Vostochny Cosmodrome, Tsiolkovsky, Amur Oblast, Russia	Soyuz 2.1b / Fregat-M	(Russia) Roscomos	36	Success
6	25 April 2021	Site 1S	Vostochny Cosmodrome, Tsiolkovsky, Amur Oblast, Russia	Soyuz 2.1b / Fregat-M	(Russia) Roscomos	36	Success
7	28 May 2021	Site 1S	Vostochny Cosmodrome, Tsiolkovsky, Amur Oblast, Russia	Soyuz 2.1b / Fregat-M	(Russia) Roscomos	36	Success
8	1 July 2021	Site 1S	Vostochny Cosmodrome, Tsiolkovsky, Amur Oblast, Russia	Soyuz 2.1b / Fregat-M	(Russia) Roscomos	36	Success
9	21 August 2021	Site 31	Baikonur Cosmodrome, Baikonur, Kyzylorda Region, Kazakhstan	Soyuz 2.1b / Fregat-M	(Russia) Roscomos	34	Success
10	14 September 2021	Site 31	Baikonur Cosmodrome, Baikonur, Kyzylorda Region, Kazakhstan	Soyuz 2.1b / Fregat-M	(Russia) Roscomos	34	Success
11	14 October 2021	Site 1S	Vostochny Cosmodrome, Tsiolkovsky, Amur Oblast, Russia	Soyuz 2.1b / Fregat-M	(Russia) Roscomos	36	Success
12	27 December 2021	Site 31	Baikonur Cosmodrome, Baikonur, Kyzylorda Region, Kazakhstan	Soyuz 2.1b / Fregat-M	(Russia) Roscomos	36	Success
13	10 February 2022	Soyuz Launch Complex	Guiana Space Centre, Kourou, French Guiana, France	Soyuz ST-B / Fregat-MT	(Russia) Roscomos	34	Success
-	4 March 2022	Site 31	Baikonur Cosmodrome, Baikonur, Kyzylorda Region, Kazakhstan	Soyuz 2.1b / Fregat-M	(Russia) Roscomos	36	Aborted on launch pad, potentially scrapped
14	22 October 2022	SDSC SLP	Satish Dhawan Space Centre, Sriharikota, Andhra Pradesh, India	LVM3	(India) ISRO	36	Success
15	8 Dec 2022	LC-39A	Kennedy Space Center, Merritt Island, Florida, USA	Falcon 9 Block 5	(United States) SpaceX	40	Success
16	10 Jan 2023	SLC-40	Cape Canaveral Space Force Station, Brevard County, Florida, USA	Falcon 9 Block 5	(United States) SpaceX	40	Success
17	9 Mar 2023	SLC-40	Cape Canaveral Space Force Station, Brevard County, Florida, USA	Falcon 9 Block 5	(United States) SpaceX	40	Success
18	26 Mar 2023	SDSC SLP	Satish Dhawan Space Centre, Sriharikota, Tirupati district, Andhra Pradesh, India	LVM3	(India) ISRO	36	Success
20	20 Oct 2024	SLC-4E	Vandenberg Space Force Base, Santa Barbara, California, USA	Falcon 9 Block 5	(United States) SpaceX	20	Success

Total number of operational satellites: 652 as of 20 Oct 2024.

=== Generation 2 satellites ===
Flight No.	Date/Time (UTC)	Launch complex	Launch site	Launch vehicle	Launch agency	Number deployed	Outcome
19	20 May 2023	SLC-4E	Vandenberg Space Force Base, Santa Barbara, California, USA	Falcon 9 Block 5	(United States) SpaceX	16 including JoeySat test satellite	Success

== Active internet services ==
In May 2021, OneWeb said that its then current constellation (218 spacecraft), as well as an additional 36 satellites planned to launch on 1 July 2021, would be equipped to service northern regions, including the United Kingdom, Alaska, Northern Europe, Greenland, Iceland, the Arctic Seas, and Canada, by the end of the year.

The company's 648-satellite network was planned for completion by late 2022, with OneWeb making global internet services available at that time. Owing to launch delays from Roscosmos (see above) the constellation was not completed until mid 2023 following three launches in the first half of the year.

By the end of June 2023, services were covering most of Europe and the United States. Global coverage is expected to be available by the end of 2023 once all satellites are in their final positions and the ground stations completed. As of November 2024, Morocco is set to give regulatory approval to OneWeb by 2025.

== Concerns ==
=== End-of-life concerns ===
With such a large number of satellites being added to the already crowded low Earth orbit, plans for handling the satellites once the operational life of each satellite is completed are an important consideration. Concerns about adding to the existing space debris problem have been expressed.

With OneWeb satellites having higher orbits than the competing Starlink megaconstellation satellites (which will deorbit in ~5 years without action due to atmospheric drag), OneWeb satellites will not passively deorbit in a reasonable timeframe. As such, each OneWeb satellite has fuel allocated to be able to actively deorbit at its end of life. OneWeb satellites are also equipped with an Altius DogTag magnetic grappling fixture, to make it possible for another spacecraft to attach and change the orbit of satellites whose built-in deorbit functionality fails, though there does not currently exist commercial services to carry out this active debris removal service. The risk of a OneWeb satellite becoming a source of debris was determined to be <0.01, which meets NASA's Technical Standard.

=== Interference with other Earth-bound transceivers ===
OneWeb competitor, satellite fleet operator ABS, has expressed concerns about the amount of electromagnetic interference that the OneWeb constellation could add to existing terrestrial transceivers.

=== Russian security concerns ===
Vladimir Sadovnikov of the Federal Security Service (FSB) stated in 2018 that the FSB was opposed to OneWeb covering Russia, saying that OneWeb could be used for espionage purposes. OneWeb's request for a frequency band was previously rejected by the Ministry for Digital Development and Communications, purportedly due to outstanding legal issues. FSB also proposed increasing scrutiny on other satellite Internet equipment in Russia.

== Competition ==
As of November 2025, the major competitor is SpaceX's Starlink satellite network with more than 10,000 satellites (March 2026) and over 8 million customers. While OneWeb will only work with partner telephone companies, SpaceX is also serving consumers directly.

Competition to OneWeb for producing smaller and lower-cost satellites, in general, is thought to come "from other makers of small satellites, thought to include companies such as Nevada-based Sierra Nevada Corp. and Britain's Surrey Satellite Technology Ltd." as of 2014.

Amazon announced a large broadband internet satellite constellation proposal in April 2019, planning to launch up to 3,236 satellites in the next decade in what Amazon called "Project Kuiper" (now Amazon Leo), a satellite constellation that will work in concert with Amazon's previously announced large network of 12 satellite ground station facilities (the "AWS Ground Station unit") announced in November 2018.

Historically, earlier companies that have attempted to build satellite internet service networks and provide space-based internet connections have not fared well, as these services were hobbled by high costs which consequently attracted few users. Iridium SSC filed for bankruptcy protection in 1999, Globalstar did the same in 2002, and Teledesic suspended its satellite construction work in the same year.

== See also ==
- Iridium satellite constellation — 82 operational satellites used to provide global satellite phone services.
- Orbcom satellite constellation — 29 operational satellites used to provide global asset monitoring and messaging services.
- Starlink satellite constellation — operational globally, with more than 10,000 satellites and more than 8 million subscribers as of March 2026.
- China national satellite internet project
- Lynk Global — a satellite-to-mobile-phone satellite constellation with the objective of coverage to traditional low-cost mobile devices
- Teledesic — a former (1990s) venture to accomplish broadband satellite internet services
- Viasat, Inc. — a current broadband satellite provider providing fixed, ground mobile, and airborne antennas
